

272001–272100 

|-bgcolor=#d6d6d6
| 272001 ||  || — || February 2, 2005 || Catalina || CSS || — || align=right | 3.9 km || 
|-id=002 bgcolor=#d6d6d6
| 272002 ||  || — || February 2, 2005 || Socorro || LINEAR || — || align=right | 3.6 km || 
|-id=003 bgcolor=#d6d6d6
| 272003 ||  || — || February 4, 2005 || Kitt Peak || Spacewatch || TIR || align=right | 3.9 km || 
|-id=004 bgcolor=#d6d6d6
| 272004 ||  || — || February 4, 2005 || Socorro || LINEAR || — || align=right | 3.3 km || 
|-id=005 bgcolor=#d6d6d6
| 272005 ||  || — || February 2, 2005 || Catalina || CSS || THM || align=right | 3.4 km || 
|-id=006 bgcolor=#d6d6d6
| 272006 ||  || — || February 9, 2005 || Anderson Mesa || LONEOS || HYG || align=right | 3.5 km || 
|-id=007 bgcolor=#d6d6d6
| 272007 ||  || — || February 9, 2005 || Anderson Mesa || LONEOS || 7:4 || align=right | 5.8 km || 
|-id=008 bgcolor=#d6d6d6
| 272008 ||  || — || February 9, 2005 || Socorro || LINEAR || — || align=right | 4.2 km || 
|-id=009 bgcolor=#d6d6d6
| 272009 ||  || — || February 14, 2005 || Kitt Peak || Spacewatch || HYG || align=right | 2.8 km || 
|-id=010 bgcolor=#d6d6d6
| 272010 || 2005 DP || — || February 28, 2005 || Junk Bond || Junk Bond Obs. || VER || align=right | 4.9 km || 
|-id=011 bgcolor=#d6d6d6
| 272011 ||  || — || February 28, 2005 || Goodricke-Pigott || R. A. Tucker || — || align=right | 5.5 km || 
|-id=012 bgcolor=#d6d6d6
| 272012 ||  || — || March 1, 2005 || Kitt Peak || Spacewatch || EOS || align=right | 2.7 km || 
|-id=013 bgcolor=#d6d6d6
| 272013 ||  || — || March 1, 2005 || Kitt Peak || Spacewatch || HYG || align=right | 4.1 km || 
|-id=014 bgcolor=#fefefe
| 272014 ||  || — || March 2, 2005 || Catalina || CSS || — || align=right | 1.1 km || 
|-id=015 bgcolor=#d6d6d6
| 272015 ||  || — || March 2, 2005 || Catalina || CSS || — || align=right | 2.9 km || 
|-id=016 bgcolor=#d6d6d6
| 272016 ||  || — || March 3, 2005 || Kitt Peak || Spacewatch || HYG || align=right | 3.5 km || 
|-id=017 bgcolor=#d6d6d6
| 272017 ||  || — || March 3, 2005 || Catalina || CSS || — || align=right | 4.5 km || 
|-id=018 bgcolor=#d6d6d6
| 272018 ||  || — || March 3, 2005 || Catalina || CSS || — || align=right | 3.0 km || 
|-id=019 bgcolor=#d6d6d6
| 272019 ||  || — || March 3, 2005 || Catalina || CSS || — || align=right | 4.7 km || 
|-id=020 bgcolor=#d6d6d6
| 272020 ||  || — || March 3, 2005 || Catalina || CSS || EOS || align=right | 2.7 km || 
|-id=021 bgcolor=#fefefe
| 272021 ||  || — || March 3, 2005 || Catalina || CSS || — || align=right data-sort-value="0.78" | 780 m || 
|-id=022 bgcolor=#d6d6d6
| 272022 ||  || — || March 3, 2005 || Catalina || CSS || — || align=right | 3.2 km || 
|-id=023 bgcolor=#d6d6d6
| 272023 ||  || — || March 3, 2005 || Catalina || CSS || — || align=right | 3.4 km || 
|-id=024 bgcolor=#d6d6d6
| 272024 ||  || — || March 3, 2005 || Catalina || CSS || — || align=right | 4.0 km || 
|-id=025 bgcolor=#d6d6d6
| 272025 ||  || — || March 4, 2005 || Catalina || CSS || — || align=right | 3.6 km || 
|-id=026 bgcolor=#d6d6d6
| 272026 ||  || — || March 4, 2005 || Catalina || CSS || — || align=right | 3.0 km || 
|-id=027 bgcolor=#d6d6d6
| 272027 ||  || — || March 2, 2005 || Catalina || CSS || — || align=right | 4.7 km || 
|-id=028 bgcolor=#d6d6d6
| 272028 ||  || — || March 3, 2005 || Kitt Peak || Spacewatch || — || align=right | 4.1 km || 
|-id=029 bgcolor=#fefefe
| 272029 ||  || — || March 3, 2005 || Kitt Peak || Spacewatch || — || align=right data-sort-value="0.89" | 890 m || 
|-id=030 bgcolor=#d6d6d6
| 272030 ||  || — || March 3, 2005 || Kitt Peak || Spacewatch || — || align=right | 3.7 km || 
|-id=031 bgcolor=#d6d6d6
| 272031 ||  || — || March 3, 2005 || Catalina || CSS || — || align=right | 6.3 km || 
|-id=032 bgcolor=#d6d6d6
| 272032 ||  || — || March 3, 2005 || Catalina || CSS || VER || align=right | 3.8 km || 
|-id=033 bgcolor=#d6d6d6
| 272033 ||  || — || March 4, 2005 || Kitt Peak || Spacewatch || — || align=right | 3.7 km || 
|-id=034 bgcolor=#d6d6d6
| 272034 ||  || — || March 4, 2005 || Mount Lemmon || Mount Lemmon Survey || — || align=right | 2.7 km || 
|-id=035 bgcolor=#d6d6d6
| 272035 ||  || — || March 4, 2005 || Kitt Peak || Spacewatch || — || align=right | 5.2 km || 
|-id=036 bgcolor=#fefefe
| 272036 ||  || — || March 4, 2005 || Catalina || CSS || — || align=right | 1.1 km || 
|-id=037 bgcolor=#d6d6d6
| 272037 ||  || — || March 4, 2005 || Catalina || CSS || — || align=right | 3.4 km || 
|-id=038 bgcolor=#d6d6d6
| 272038 ||  || — || March 4, 2005 || Catalina || CSS || — || align=right | 4.5 km || 
|-id=039 bgcolor=#d6d6d6
| 272039 ||  || — || March 4, 2005 || Kitt Peak || Spacewatch || — || align=right | 4.4 km || 
|-id=040 bgcolor=#d6d6d6
| 272040 ||  || — || March 8, 2005 || Anderson Mesa || LONEOS || — || align=right | 3.2 km || 
|-id=041 bgcolor=#d6d6d6
| 272041 ||  || — || March 8, 2005 || Kitt Peak || Spacewatch || — || align=right | 3.5 km || 
|-id=042 bgcolor=#d6d6d6
| 272042 ||  || — || March 10, 2005 || Goodricke-Pigott || R. A. Tucker || EUP || align=right | 5.3 km || 
|-id=043 bgcolor=#fefefe
| 272043 ||  || — || March 3, 2005 || Catalina || CSS || V || align=right data-sort-value="0.84" | 840 m || 
|-id=044 bgcolor=#d6d6d6
| 272044 ||  || — || March 3, 2005 || Catalina || CSS || — || align=right | 4.4 km || 
|-id=045 bgcolor=#d6d6d6
| 272045 ||  || — || March 4, 2005 || Kitt Peak || Spacewatch || VER || align=right | 3.5 km || 
|-id=046 bgcolor=#d6d6d6
| 272046 ||  || — || March 4, 2005 || Mount Lemmon || Mount Lemmon Survey || EOS || align=right | 3.4 km || 
|-id=047 bgcolor=#d6d6d6
| 272047 ||  || — || March 4, 2005 || Mount Lemmon || Mount Lemmon Survey || — || align=right | 4.2 km || 
|-id=048 bgcolor=#d6d6d6
| 272048 ||  || — || March 8, 2005 || Socorro || LINEAR || TIR || align=right | 4.6 km || 
|-id=049 bgcolor=#d6d6d6
| 272049 ||  || — || March 9, 2005 || Catalina || CSS || ALA || align=right | 6.2 km || 
|-id=050 bgcolor=#d6d6d6
| 272050 ||  || — || March 9, 2005 || Catalina || CSS || — || align=right | 4.9 km || 
|-id=051 bgcolor=#fefefe
| 272051 ||  || — || March 9, 2005 || Socorro || LINEAR || V || align=right data-sort-value="0.78" | 780 m || 
|-id=052 bgcolor=#d6d6d6
| 272052 ||  || — || March 10, 2005 || Mount Lemmon || Mount Lemmon Survey || THM || align=right | 3.4 km || 
|-id=053 bgcolor=#d6d6d6
| 272053 ||  || — || March 10, 2005 || Mount Lemmon || Mount Lemmon Survey || EOS || align=right | 2.8 km || 
|-id=054 bgcolor=#d6d6d6
| 272054 ||  || — || March 9, 2005 || Mount Lemmon || Mount Lemmon Survey || — || align=right | 3.7 km || 
|-id=055 bgcolor=#d6d6d6
| 272055 ||  || — || March 7, 2005 || Socorro || LINEAR || — || align=right | 4.8 km || 
|-id=056 bgcolor=#d6d6d6
| 272056 ||  || — || March 8, 2005 || Mount Lemmon || Mount Lemmon Survey || EOS || align=right | 2.0 km || 
|-id=057 bgcolor=#d6d6d6
| 272057 ||  || — || March 8, 2005 || Kitt Peak || Spacewatch || — || align=right | 4.0 km || 
|-id=058 bgcolor=#d6d6d6
| 272058 ||  || — || March 8, 2005 || Kitt Peak || Spacewatch || EUP || align=right | 4.3 km || 
|-id=059 bgcolor=#d6d6d6
| 272059 ||  || — || March 9, 2005 || Mount Lemmon || Mount Lemmon Survey || VER || align=right | 3.9 km || 
|-id=060 bgcolor=#d6d6d6
| 272060 ||  || — || March 10, 2005 || Catalina || CSS || — || align=right | 6.9 km || 
|-id=061 bgcolor=#d6d6d6
| 272061 ||  || — || March 11, 2005 || Mount Lemmon || Mount Lemmon Survey || — || align=right | 3.7 km || 
|-id=062 bgcolor=#fefefe
| 272062 ||  || — || March 11, 2005 || Mount Lemmon || Mount Lemmon Survey || NYS || align=right data-sort-value="0.92" | 920 m || 
|-id=063 bgcolor=#d6d6d6
| 272063 ||  || — || March 11, 2005 || Anderson Mesa || LONEOS || TIR || align=right | 3.4 km || 
|-id=064 bgcolor=#d6d6d6
| 272064 ||  || — || March 13, 2005 || Mount Lemmon || Mount Lemmon Survey || — || align=right | 5.2 km || 
|-id=065 bgcolor=#d6d6d6
| 272065 ||  || — || March 4, 2005 || Catalina || CSS || ALA || align=right | 4.6 km || 
|-id=066 bgcolor=#d6d6d6
| 272066 ||  || — || March 8, 2005 || Anderson Mesa || LONEOS || — || align=right | 4.0 km || 
|-id=067 bgcolor=#fefefe
| 272067 ||  || — || March 8, 2005 || Kitt Peak || Spacewatch || — || align=right data-sort-value="0.65" | 650 m || 
|-id=068 bgcolor=#d6d6d6
| 272068 ||  || — || March 9, 2005 || Catalina || CSS || — || align=right | 3.7 km || 
|-id=069 bgcolor=#d6d6d6
| 272069 ||  || — || March 9, 2005 || Mount Lemmon || Mount Lemmon Survey || — || align=right | 6.1 km || 
|-id=070 bgcolor=#d6d6d6
| 272070 ||  || — || March 9, 2005 || Catalina || CSS || EUP || align=right | 3.5 km || 
|-id=071 bgcolor=#d6d6d6
| 272071 ||  || — || March 9, 2005 || Socorro || LINEAR || — || align=right | 4.1 km || 
|-id=072 bgcolor=#d6d6d6
| 272072 ||  || — || March 10, 2005 || Anderson Mesa || LONEOS || — || align=right | 4.1 km || 
|-id=073 bgcolor=#d6d6d6
| 272073 ||  || — || March 11, 2005 || Mount Lemmon || Mount Lemmon Survey || VER || align=right | 3.6 km || 
|-id=074 bgcolor=#d6d6d6
| 272074 ||  || — || March 11, 2005 || Mount Lemmon || Mount Lemmon Survey || — || align=right | 3.5 km || 
|-id=075 bgcolor=#d6d6d6
| 272075 ||  || — || March 11, 2005 || Mount Lemmon || Mount Lemmon Survey || — || align=right | 4.1 km || 
|-id=076 bgcolor=#d6d6d6
| 272076 ||  || — || March 13, 2005 || Mount Lemmon || Mount Lemmon Survey || — || align=right | 3.9 km || 
|-id=077 bgcolor=#d6d6d6
| 272077 ||  || — || March 13, 2005 || Kitt Peak || Spacewatch || — || align=right | 3.7 km || 
|-id=078 bgcolor=#d6d6d6
| 272078 ||  || — || March 10, 2005 || Catalina || CSS || — || align=right | 4.9 km || 
|-id=079 bgcolor=#d6d6d6
| 272079 ||  || — || March 10, 2005 || Catalina || CSS || — || align=right | 5.5 km || 
|-id=080 bgcolor=#d6d6d6
| 272080 ||  || — || March 4, 2005 || Catalina || CSS || — || align=right | 6.7 km || 
|-id=081 bgcolor=#d6d6d6
| 272081 ||  || — || March 8, 2005 || Socorro || LINEAR || LUT || align=right | 5.6 km || 
|-id=082 bgcolor=#d6d6d6
| 272082 ||  || — || March 10, 2005 || Catalina || CSS || — || align=right | 4.5 km || 
|-id=083 bgcolor=#d6d6d6
| 272083 ||  || — || March 10, 2005 || Mount Lemmon || Mount Lemmon Survey || — || align=right | 3.7 km || 
|-id=084 bgcolor=#d6d6d6
| 272084 ||  || — || March 9, 2005 || Mount Lemmon || Mount Lemmon Survey || THM || align=right | 2.7 km || 
|-id=085 bgcolor=#d6d6d6
| 272085 ||  || — || March 4, 2005 || Socorro || LINEAR || VER || align=right | 4.5 km || 
|-id=086 bgcolor=#d6d6d6
| 272086 ||  || — || March 3, 2005 || Catalina || CSS || — || align=right | 3.5 km || 
|-id=087 bgcolor=#d6d6d6
| 272087 ||  || — || March 2, 2005 || Catalina || CSS || — || align=right | 3.9 km || 
|-id=088 bgcolor=#d6d6d6
| 272088 ||  || — || March 3, 2005 || Catalina || CSS || — || align=right | 4.5 km || 
|-id=089 bgcolor=#d6d6d6
| 272089 ||  || — || March 17, 2005 || Goodricke-Pigott || R. A. Tucker || HYG || align=right | 4.4 km || 
|-id=090 bgcolor=#d6d6d6
| 272090 ||  || — || April 2, 2005 || Mayhill || A. Lowe || — || align=right | 2.7 km || 
|-id=091 bgcolor=#d6d6d6
| 272091 ||  || — || April 2, 2005 || Mount Lemmon || Mount Lemmon Survey || HYG || align=right | 3.6 km || 
|-id=092 bgcolor=#d6d6d6
| 272092 ||  || — || April 4, 2005 || Catalina || CSS || 7:4 || align=right | 3.6 km || 
|-id=093 bgcolor=#d6d6d6
| 272093 ||  || — || April 4, 2005 || Mount Lemmon || Mount Lemmon Survey || — || align=right | 3.6 km || 
|-id=094 bgcolor=#d6d6d6
| 272094 ||  || — || April 3, 2005 || Socorro || LINEAR || — || align=right | 4.6 km || 
|-id=095 bgcolor=#fefefe
| 272095 ||  || — || April 5, 2005 || Mount Lemmon || Mount Lemmon Survey || — || align=right data-sort-value="0.59" | 590 m || 
|-id=096 bgcolor=#d6d6d6
| 272096 ||  || — || April 2, 2005 || Catalina || CSS || — || align=right | 4.6 km || 
|-id=097 bgcolor=#d6d6d6
| 272097 ||  || — || April 4, 2005 || Kitt Peak || Spacewatch || HYG || align=right | 3.9 km || 
|-id=098 bgcolor=#d6d6d6
| 272098 ||  || — || April 10, 2005 || Mount Lemmon || Mount Lemmon Survey || — || align=right | 3.3 km || 
|-id=099 bgcolor=#d6d6d6
| 272099 ||  || — || April 2, 2005 || Calvin-Rehoboth || Calvin–Rehoboth Obs. || — || align=right | 3.1 km || 
|-id=100 bgcolor=#d6d6d6
| 272100 ||  || — || April 11, 2005 || Mount Lemmon || Mount Lemmon Survey || — || align=right | 4.1 km || 
|}

272101–272200 

|-bgcolor=#d6d6d6
| 272101 ||  || — || April 10, 2005 || Kitt Peak || M. W. Buie || — || align=right | 3.0 km || 
|-id=102 bgcolor=#fefefe
| 272102 ||  || — || April 6, 2005 || Catalina || CSS || — || align=right | 1.00 km || 
|-id=103 bgcolor=#fefefe
| 272103 ||  || — || April 16, 2005 || Kitt Peak || Spacewatch || — || align=right data-sort-value="0.84" | 840 m || 
|-id=104 bgcolor=#d6d6d6
| 272104 ||  || — || May 3, 2005 || Kitt Peak || Spacewatch || 7:4 || align=right | 5.6 km || 
|-id=105 bgcolor=#fefefe
| 272105 ||  || — || May 4, 2005 || Kitt Peak || Spacewatch || — || align=right data-sort-value="0.82" | 820 m || 
|-id=106 bgcolor=#d6d6d6
| 272106 ||  || — || May 9, 2005 || Catalina || CSS || — || align=right | 3.9 km || 
|-id=107 bgcolor=#fefefe
| 272107 ||  || — || May 7, 2005 || Mount Lemmon || Mount Lemmon Survey || — || align=right data-sort-value="0.80" | 800 m || 
|-id=108 bgcolor=#d6d6d6
| 272108 ||  || — || May 8, 2005 || Mount Lemmon || Mount Lemmon Survey || — || align=right | 4.0 km || 
|-id=109 bgcolor=#fefefe
| 272109 ||  || — || May 8, 2005 || Kitt Peak || Spacewatch || FLO || align=right data-sort-value="0.72" | 720 m || 
|-id=110 bgcolor=#fefefe
| 272110 ||  || — || May 9, 2005 || Kitt Peak || Spacewatch || — || align=right | 1.1 km || 
|-id=111 bgcolor=#fefefe
| 272111 ||  || — || May 11, 2005 || Kitt Peak || Spacewatch || — || align=right data-sort-value="0.78" | 780 m || 
|-id=112 bgcolor=#fefefe
| 272112 ||  || — || May 12, 2005 || Mount Lemmon || Mount Lemmon Survey || — || align=right data-sort-value="0.77" | 770 m || 
|-id=113 bgcolor=#fefefe
| 272113 ||  || — || May 3, 2005 || Kitt Peak || Spacewatch || FLO || align=right data-sort-value="0.60" | 600 m || 
|-id=114 bgcolor=#fefefe
| 272114 ||  || — || May 11, 2005 || Palomar || NEAT || — || align=right | 1.1 km || 
|-id=115 bgcolor=#E9E9E9
| 272115 ||  || — || May 16, 2005 || Kitt Peak || Spacewatch || — || align=right | 1.2 km || 
|-id=116 bgcolor=#fefefe
| 272116 ||  || — || May 16, 2005 || Palomar || NEAT || — || align=right data-sort-value="0.92" | 920 m || 
|-id=117 bgcolor=#E9E9E9
| 272117 ||  || — || June 3, 2005 || Kitt Peak || Spacewatch || — || align=right | 1.1 km || 
|-id=118 bgcolor=#fefefe
| 272118 ||  || — || June 8, 2005 || Kitt Peak || Spacewatch || — || align=right data-sort-value="0.87" | 870 m || 
|-id=119 bgcolor=#fefefe
| 272119 ||  || — || June 10, 2005 || Kitt Peak || Spacewatch || — || align=right | 1.0 km || 
|-id=120 bgcolor=#fefefe
| 272120 ||  || — || June 10, 2005 || Kitt Peak || Spacewatch || FLO || align=right data-sort-value="0.63" | 630 m || 
|-id=121 bgcolor=#fefefe
| 272121 ||  || — || June 13, 2005 || Mount Lemmon || Mount Lemmon Survey || — || align=right data-sort-value="0.66" | 660 m || 
|-id=122 bgcolor=#fefefe
| 272122 ||  || — || June 21, 2005 || Palomar || NEAT || — || align=right | 1.1 km || 
|-id=123 bgcolor=#E9E9E9
| 272123 ||  || — || June 27, 2005 || Kitt Peak || Spacewatch || — || align=right | 1.5 km || 
|-id=124 bgcolor=#C2FFFF
| 272124 ||  || — || June 27, 2005 || Kitt Peak || Spacewatch || L4 || align=right | 11 km || 
|-id=125 bgcolor=#fefefe
| 272125 ||  || — || June 30, 2005 || Kitt Peak || Spacewatch || — || align=right | 1.0 km || 
|-id=126 bgcolor=#fefefe
| 272126 ||  || — || June 27, 2005 || Kitt Peak || Spacewatch || V || align=right data-sort-value="0.86" | 860 m || 
|-id=127 bgcolor=#fefefe
| 272127 ||  || — || June 29, 2005 || Kitt Peak || Spacewatch || — || align=right | 1.0 km || 
|-id=128 bgcolor=#fefefe
| 272128 ||  || — || June 29, 2005 || Kitt Peak || Spacewatch || ERI || align=right | 1.9 km || 
|-id=129 bgcolor=#fefefe
| 272129 ||  || — || June 30, 2005 || Kitt Peak || Spacewatch || — || align=right | 1.1 km || 
|-id=130 bgcolor=#fefefe
| 272130 ||  || — || June 28, 2005 || Palomar || NEAT || FLO || align=right data-sort-value="0.91" | 910 m || 
|-id=131 bgcolor=#fefefe
| 272131 ||  || — || June 29, 2005 || Palomar || NEAT || FLO || align=right data-sort-value="0.65" | 650 m || 
|-id=132 bgcolor=#fefefe
| 272132 ||  || — || June 30, 2005 || Kitt Peak || Spacewatch || fast? || align=right | 1.0 km || 
|-id=133 bgcolor=#fefefe
| 272133 ||  || — || June 29, 2005 || Palomar || NEAT || — || align=right data-sort-value="0.85" | 850 m || 
|-id=134 bgcolor=#fefefe
| 272134 ||  || — || June 29, 2005 || Kitt Peak || Spacewatch || — || align=right data-sort-value="0.90" | 900 m || 
|-id=135 bgcolor=#fefefe
| 272135 ||  || — || June 27, 2005 || Kitt Peak || Spacewatch || — || align=right data-sort-value="0.66" | 660 m || 
|-id=136 bgcolor=#fefefe
| 272136 ||  || — || June 27, 2005 || Palomar || NEAT || FLO || align=right data-sort-value="0.84" | 840 m || 
|-id=137 bgcolor=#fefefe
| 272137 ||  || — || June 29, 2005 || Kitt Peak || Spacewatch || FLO || align=right data-sort-value="0.55" | 550 m || 
|-id=138 bgcolor=#fefefe
| 272138 ||  || — || June 17, 2005 || Mount Lemmon || Mount Lemmon Survey || — || align=right data-sort-value="0.87" | 870 m || 
|-id=139 bgcolor=#fefefe
| 272139 ||  || — || June 17, 2005 || Mount Lemmon || Mount Lemmon Survey || NYS || align=right data-sort-value="0.84" | 840 m || 
|-id=140 bgcolor=#fefefe
| 272140 ||  || — || June 17, 2005 || Mount Lemmon || Mount Lemmon Survey || — || align=right data-sort-value="0.84" | 840 m || 
|-id=141 bgcolor=#fefefe
| 272141 ||  || — || July 1, 2005 || Kitt Peak || Spacewatch || — || align=right data-sort-value="0.86" | 860 m || 
|-id=142 bgcolor=#fefefe
| 272142 ||  || — || July 1, 2005 || Kitt Peak || Spacewatch || FLO || align=right data-sort-value="0.61" | 610 m || 
|-id=143 bgcolor=#fefefe
| 272143 ||  || — || July 1, 2005 || Kitt Peak || Spacewatch || — || align=right data-sort-value="0.92" | 920 m || 
|-id=144 bgcolor=#fefefe
| 272144 ||  || — || July 3, 2005 || Mount Lemmon || Mount Lemmon Survey || NYS || align=right data-sort-value="0.66" | 660 m || 
|-id=145 bgcolor=#d6d6d6
| 272145 ||  || — || July 6, 2005 || Reedy Creek || J. Broughton || 3:2 || align=right | 7.0 km || 
|-id=146 bgcolor=#fefefe
| 272146 ||  || — || July 1, 2005 || Kitt Peak || Spacewatch || — || align=right data-sort-value="0.92" | 920 m || 
|-id=147 bgcolor=#fefefe
| 272147 ||  || — || July 4, 2005 || Kitt Peak || Spacewatch || — || align=right data-sort-value="0.75" | 750 m || 
|-id=148 bgcolor=#FA8072
| 272148 ||  || — || July 5, 2005 || Socorro || LINEAR || — || align=right | 1.2 km || 
|-id=149 bgcolor=#fefefe
| 272149 ||  || — || July 5, 2005 || Palomar || NEAT || NYS || align=right data-sort-value="0.67" | 670 m || 
|-id=150 bgcolor=#fefefe
| 272150 ||  || — || July 6, 2005 || Kitt Peak || Spacewatch || V || align=right data-sort-value="0.85" | 850 m || 
|-id=151 bgcolor=#E9E9E9
| 272151 ||  || — || July 5, 2005 || Palomar || NEAT || — || align=right data-sort-value="0.87" | 870 m || 
|-id=152 bgcolor=#fefefe
| 272152 ||  || — || July 7, 2005 || Kitt Peak || Spacewatch || NYS || align=right data-sort-value="0.75" | 750 m || 
|-id=153 bgcolor=#fefefe
| 272153 ||  || — || July 10, 2005 || Kitt Peak || Spacewatch || — || align=right | 1.1 km || 
|-id=154 bgcolor=#E9E9E9
| 272154 ||  || — || July 9, 2005 || Kitt Peak || Spacewatch || — || align=right | 1.3 km || 
|-id=155 bgcolor=#fefefe
| 272155 ||  || — || July 4, 2005 || Palomar || NEAT || V || align=right data-sort-value="0.72" | 720 m || 
|-id=156 bgcolor=#fefefe
| 272156 ||  || — || July 10, 2005 || Kitt Peak || Spacewatch || V || align=right data-sort-value="0.60" | 600 m || 
|-id=157 bgcolor=#fefefe
| 272157 ||  || — || July 12, 2005 || Mount Lemmon || Mount Lemmon Survey || V || align=right data-sort-value="0.87" | 870 m || 
|-id=158 bgcolor=#fefefe
| 272158 ||  || — || July 4, 2005 || Kitt Peak || Spacewatch || — || align=right | 1.0 km || 
|-id=159 bgcolor=#fefefe
| 272159 ||  || — || July 5, 2005 || Kitt Peak || Spacewatch || — || align=right data-sort-value="0.98" | 980 m || 
|-id=160 bgcolor=#fefefe
| 272160 ||  || — || July 6, 2005 || Kitt Peak || Spacewatch || — || align=right data-sort-value="0.62" | 620 m || 
|-id=161 bgcolor=#fefefe
| 272161 ||  || — || July 8, 2005 || Kitt Peak || Spacewatch || FLO || align=right data-sort-value="0.72" | 720 m || 
|-id=162 bgcolor=#fefefe
| 272162 ||  || — || July 10, 2005 || Kitt Peak || Spacewatch || — || align=right data-sort-value="0.78" | 780 m || 
|-id=163 bgcolor=#fefefe
| 272163 ||  || — || July 7, 2005 || Mauna Kea || C. Veillet || FLO || align=right data-sort-value="0.70" | 700 m || 
|-id=164 bgcolor=#fefefe
| 272164 ||  || — || July 12, 2005 || Mount Lemmon || Mount Lemmon Survey || — || align=right data-sort-value="0.89" | 890 m || 
|-id=165 bgcolor=#fefefe
| 272165 ||  || — || July 19, 2005 || Palomar || NEAT || — || align=right | 1.4 km || 
|-id=166 bgcolor=#E9E9E9
| 272166 ||  || — || July 19, 2005 || Palomar || NEAT || CLO || align=right | 2.6 km || 
|-id=167 bgcolor=#E9E9E9
| 272167 ||  || — || July 19, 2005 || Palomar || NEAT || — || align=right | 3.2 km || 
|-id=168 bgcolor=#fefefe
| 272168 ||  || — || July 28, 2005 || Reedy Creek || J. Broughton || ERI || align=right | 2.7 km || 
|-id=169 bgcolor=#fefefe
| 272169 ||  || — || July 28, 2005 || Palomar || NEAT || — || align=right data-sort-value="0.89" | 890 m || 
|-id=170 bgcolor=#fefefe
| 272170 ||  || — || July 28, 2005 || Palomar || NEAT || MAS || align=right data-sort-value="0.94" | 940 m || 
|-id=171 bgcolor=#fefefe
| 272171 ||  || — || July 27, 2005 || Palomar || NEAT || NYS || align=right data-sort-value="0.92" | 920 m || 
|-id=172 bgcolor=#fefefe
| 272172 ||  || — || July 27, 2005 || Palomar || NEAT || FLO || align=right data-sort-value="0.64" | 640 m || 
|-id=173 bgcolor=#fefefe
| 272173 ||  || — || July 27, 2005 || Palomar || NEAT || V || align=right data-sort-value="0.92" | 920 m || 
|-id=174 bgcolor=#fefefe
| 272174 ||  || — || July 29, 2005 || Palomar || NEAT || — || align=right data-sort-value="0.98" | 980 m || 
|-id=175 bgcolor=#fefefe
| 272175 ||  || — || July 30, 2005 || Palomar || NEAT || — || align=right data-sort-value="0.99" | 990 m || 
|-id=176 bgcolor=#fefefe
| 272176 ||  || — || July 28, 2005 || Palomar || NEAT || V || align=right data-sort-value="0.99" | 990 m || 
|-id=177 bgcolor=#fefefe
| 272177 ||  || — || July 30, 2005 || Palomar || NEAT || V || align=right data-sort-value="0.82" | 820 m || 
|-id=178 bgcolor=#fefefe
| 272178 ||  || — || July 30, 2005 || Palomar || NEAT || V || align=right data-sort-value="0.83" | 830 m || 
|-id=179 bgcolor=#fefefe
| 272179 ||  || — || July 30, 2005 || Palomar || NEAT || — || align=right data-sort-value="0.99" | 990 m || 
|-id=180 bgcolor=#fefefe
| 272180 ||  || — || July 30, 2005 || Palomar || NEAT || — || align=right | 1.0 km || 
|-id=181 bgcolor=#fefefe
| 272181 ||  || — || August 7, 2005 || Siding Spring || SSS || — || align=right | 1.2 km || 
|-id=182 bgcolor=#fefefe
| 272182 ||  || — || August 4, 2005 || Palomar || NEAT || — || align=right | 1.0 km || 
|-id=183 bgcolor=#fefefe
| 272183 ||  || — || August 4, 2005 || Palomar || NEAT || — || align=right data-sort-value="0.97" | 970 m || 
|-id=184 bgcolor=#E9E9E9
| 272184 ||  || — || August 12, 2005 || Pla D'Arguines || R. Ferrando, M. Ferrando || — || align=right | 2.0 km || 
|-id=185 bgcolor=#fefefe
| 272185 ||  || — || August 11, 2005 || Pla D'Arguines || Pla D'Arguines Obs. || FLO || align=right data-sort-value="0.67" | 670 m || 
|-id=186 bgcolor=#fefefe
| 272186 ||  || — || August 6, 2005 || Palomar || NEAT || V || align=right data-sort-value="0.71" | 710 m || 
|-id=187 bgcolor=#fefefe
| 272187 ||  || — || August 8, 2005 || Cerro Tololo || M. W. Buie || NYS || align=right data-sort-value="0.79" | 790 m || 
|-id=188 bgcolor=#fefefe
| 272188 ||  || — || August 6, 2005 || Palomar || NEAT || — || align=right | 1.1 km || 
|-id=189 bgcolor=#fefefe
| 272189 ||  || — || August 22, 2005 || Palomar || NEAT || — || align=right data-sort-value="0.83" | 830 m || 
|-id=190 bgcolor=#fefefe
| 272190 ||  || — || August 22, 2005 || Palomar || NEAT || FLO || align=right | 1.0 km || 
|-id=191 bgcolor=#FA8072
| 272191 ||  || — || August 24, 2005 || Palomar || NEAT || — || align=right | 1.0 km || 
|-id=192 bgcolor=#fefefe
| 272192 ||  || — || August 24, 2005 || Palomar || NEAT || — || align=right | 1.0 km || 
|-id=193 bgcolor=#fefefe
| 272193 ||  || — || August 24, 2005 || Palomar || NEAT || — || align=right | 1.1 km || 
|-id=194 bgcolor=#fefefe
| 272194 ||  || — || August 24, 2005 || Palomar || NEAT || — || align=right data-sort-value="0.98" | 980 m || 
|-id=195 bgcolor=#fefefe
| 272195 ||  || — || August 24, 2005 || Palomar || NEAT || — || align=right | 1.0 km || 
|-id=196 bgcolor=#fefefe
| 272196 ||  || — || August 25, 2005 || Palomar || NEAT || — || align=right | 1.4 km || 
|-id=197 bgcolor=#fefefe
| 272197 ||  || — || August 25, 2005 || Palomar || NEAT || MAS || align=right data-sort-value="0.92" | 920 m || 
|-id=198 bgcolor=#fefefe
| 272198 ||  || — || August 25, 2005 || Palomar || NEAT || NYS || align=right data-sort-value="0.86" | 860 m || 
|-id=199 bgcolor=#fefefe
| 272199 ||  || — || August 25, 2005 || Palomar || NEAT || — || align=right | 1.2 km || 
|-id=200 bgcolor=#fefefe
| 272200 ||  || — || August 25, 2005 || Palomar || NEAT || — || align=right | 1.00 km || 
|}

272201–272300 

|-bgcolor=#fefefe
| 272201 ||  || — || August 25, 2005 || Palomar || NEAT || NYSfast? || align=right data-sort-value="0.94" | 940 m || 
|-id=202 bgcolor=#fefefe
| 272202 ||  || — || August 25, 2005 || Palomar || NEAT || — || align=right | 2.2 km || 
|-id=203 bgcolor=#fefefe
| 272203 ||  || — || August 26, 2005 || Haleakala || NEAT || — || align=right | 1.3 km || 
|-id=204 bgcolor=#fefefe
| 272204 ||  || — || August 26, 2005 || Anderson Mesa || LONEOS || — || align=right | 1.1 km || 
|-id=205 bgcolor=#fefefe
| 272205 ||  || — || August 27, 2005 || Kitt Peak || Spacewatch || FLO || align=right data-sort-value="0.75" | 750 m || 
|-id=206 bgcolor=#fefefe
| 272206 ||  || — || August 27, 2005 || Anderson Mesa || LONEOS || — || align=right | 1.2 km || 
|-id=207 bgcolor=#fefefe
| 272207 ||  || — || August 27, 2005 || Kitt Peak || Spacewatch || — || align=right | 1.2 km || 
|-id=208 bgcolor=#fefefe
| 272208 ||  || — || August 27, 2005 || Kitt Peak || Spacewatch || — || align=right | 1.0 km || 
|-id=209 bgcolor=#fefefe
| 272209 Corsica ||  ||  || August 28, 2005 || Vicques || M. Ory || FLO || align=right data-sort-value="0.79" | 790 m || 
|-id=210 bgcolor=#d6d6d6
| 272210 ||  || — || August 22, 2005 || Palomar || NEAT || 3:2 || align=right | 5.6 km || 
|-id=211 bgcolor=#fefefe
| 272211 ||  || — || August 25, 2005 || Palomar || NEAT || NYS || align=right data-sort-value="0.81" | 810 m || 
|-id=212 bgcolor=#fefefe
| 272212 ||  || — || August 25, 2005 || Palomar || NEAT || NYS || align=right data-sort-value="0.77" | 770 m || 
|-id=213 bgcolor=#fefefe
| 272213 ||  || — || August 25, 2005 || Palomar || NEAT || — || align=right data-sort-value="0.96" | 960 m || 
|-id=214 bgcolor=#fefefe
| 272214 ||  || — || August 26, 2005 || Anderson Mesa || LONEOS || V || align=right | 1.1 km || 
|-id=215 bgcolor=#fefefe
| 272215 ||  || — || August 26, 2005 || Haleakala || NEAT || FLO || align=right data-sort-value="0.89" | 890 m || 
|-id=216 bgcolor=#fefefe
| 272216 ||  || — || August 26, 2005 || Palomar || NEAT || — || align=right data-sort-value="0.98" | 980 m || 
|-id=217 bgcolor=#fefefe
| 272217 ||  || — || August 26, 2005 || Palomar || NEAT || — || align=right data-sort-value="0.93" | 930 m || 
|-id=218 bgcolor=#fefefe
| 272218 ||  || — || August 26, 2005 || Palomar || NEAT || V || align=right data-sort-value="0.96" | 960 m || 
|-id=219 bgcolor=#fefefe
| 272219 ||  || — || August 25, 2005 || Palomar || NEAT || V || align=right data-sort-value="0.86" | 860 m || 
|-id=220 bgcolor=#fefefe
| 272220 ||  || — || August 25, 2005 || Palomar || NEAT || NYS || align=right data-sort-value="0.82" | 820 m || 
|-id=221 bgcolor=#fefefe
| 272221 ||  || — || August 26, 2005 || Anderson Mesa || LONEOS || — || align=right | 1.0 km || 
|-id=222 bgcolor=#fefefe
| 272222 ||  || — || August 27, 2005 || Kitt Peak || Spacewatch || — || align=right data-sort-value="0.96" | 960 m || 
|-id=223 bgcolor=#fefefe
| 272223 ||  || — || August 29, 2005 || Socorro || LINEAR || V || align=right data-sort-value="0.80" | 800 m || 
|-id=224 bgcolor=#fefefe
| 272224 ||  || — || August 29, 2005 || Socorro || LINEAR || V || align=right data-sort-value="0.96" | 960 m || 
|-id=225 bgcolor=#fefefe
| 272225 ||  || — || August 29, 2005 || Kitt Peak || Spacewatch || — || align=right data-sort-value="0.94" | 940 m || 
|-id=226 bgcolor=#fefefe
| 272226 ||  || — || August 29, 2005 || Anderson Mesa || LONEOS || — || align=right | 1.5 km || 
|-id=227 bgcolor=#d6d6d6
| 272227 ||  || — || August 29, 2005 || Anderson Mesa || LONEOS || HIL3:2 || align=right | 9.3 km || 
|-id=228 bgcolor=#fefefe
| 272228 ||  || — || August 29, 2005 || Anderson Mesa || LONEOS || — || align=right | 1.0 km || 
|-id=229 bgcolor=#fefefe
| 272229 ||  || — || August 24, 2005 || Palomar || NEAT || NYS || align=right data-sort-value="0.85" | 850 m || 
|-id=230 bgcolor=#fefefe
| 272230 ||  || — || August 28, 2005 || Bergisch Gladbach || W. Bickel || V || align=right data-sort-value="0.68" | 680 m || 
|-id=231 bgcolor=#fefefe
| 272231 ||  || — || August 22, 2005 || Palomar || NEAT || V || align=right data-sort-value="0.85" | 850 m || 
|-id=232 bgcolor=#fefefe
| 272232 ||  || — || August 27, 2005 || Palomar || NEAT || V || align=right data-sort-value="0.99" | 990 m || 
|-id=233 bgcolor=#fefefe
| 272233 ||  || — || August 27, 2005 || Palomar || NEAT || V || align=right data-sort-value="0.85" | 850 m || 
|-id=234 bgcolor=#fefefe
| 272234 ||  || — || August 27, 2005 || Palomar || NEAT || — || align=right data-sort-value="0.98" | 980 m || 
|-id=235 bgcolor=#fefefe
| 272235 ||  || — || August 27, 2005 || Palomar || NEAT || — || align=right data-sort-value="0.95" | 950 m || 
|-id=236 bgcolor=#fefefe
| 272236 ||  || — || August 27, 2005 || Palomar || NEAT || — || align=right data-sort-value="0.95" | 950 m || 
|-id=237 bgcolor=#fefefe
| 272237 ||  || — || August 27, 2005 || Palomar || NEAT || — || align=right | 1.1 km || 
|-id=238 bgcolor=#fefefe
| 272238 ||  || — || August 28, 2005 || Kitt Peak || Spacewatch || NYS || align=right data-sort-value="0.73" | 730 m || 
|-id=239 bgcolor=#fefefe
| 272239 ||  || — || August 28, 2005 || Kitt Peak || Spacewatch || — || align=right | 1.1 km || 
|-id=240 bgcolor=#fefefe
| 272240 ||  || — || August 28, 2005 || Kitt Peak || Spacewatch || V || align=right data-sort-value="0.88" | 880 m || 
|-id=241 bgcolor=#fefefe
| 272241 ||  || — || August 28, 2005 || Kitt Peak || Spacewatch || — || align=right | 1.4 km || 
|-id=242 bgcolor=#fefefe
| 272242 ||  || — || August 28, 2005 || Kitt Peak || Spacewatch || MAS || align=right data-sort-value="0.71" | 710 m || 
|-id=243 bgcolor=#fefefe
| 272243 ||  || — || August 28, 2005 || Kitt Peak || Spacewatch || V || align=right data-sort-value="0.59" | 590 m || 
|-id=244 bgcolor=#fefefe
| 272244 ||  || — || August 28, 2005 || Kitt Peak || Spacewatch || V || align=right data-sort-value="0.79" | 790 m || 
|-id=245 bgcolor=#fefefe
| 272245 ||  || — || August 28, 2005 || Kitt Peak || Spacewatch || MAS || align=right data-sort-value="0.85" | 850 m || 
|-id=246 bgcolor=#fefefe
| 272246 ||  || — || August 28, 2005 || Kitt Peak || Spacewatch || FLO || align=right data-sort-value="0.71" | 710 m || 
|-id=247 bgcolor=#fefefe
| 272247 ||  || — || August 28, 2005 || Kitt Peak || Spacewatch || NYS || align=right | 1.0 km || 
|-id=248 bgcolor=#fefefe
| 272248 ||  || — || August 28, 2005 || Kitt Peak || Spacewatch || — || align=right data-sort-value="0.87" | 870 m || 
|-id=249 bgcolor=#fefefe
| 272249 ||  || — || August 28, 2005 || Kitt Peak || Spacewatch || — || align=right | 1.3 km || 
|-id=250 bgcolor=#E9E9E9
| 272250 ||  || — || August 28, 2005 || Kitt Peak || Spacewatch || — || align=right | 1.0 km || 
|-id=251 bgcolor=#fefefe
| 272251 ||  || — || August 28, 2005 || Kitt Peak || Spacewatch || — || align=right data-sort-value="0.89" | 890 m || 
|-id=252 bgcolor=#fefefe
| 272252 ||  || — || August 28, 2005 || Kitt Peak || Spacewatch || NYS || align=right data-sort-value="0.90" | 900 m || 
|-id=253 bgcolor=#fefefe
| 272253 ||  || — || August 27, 2005 || Palomar || NEAT || FLO || align=right data-sort-value="0.90" | 900 m || 
|-id=254 bgcolor=#FA8072
| 272254 ||  || — || August 27, 2005 || Anderson Mesa || LONEOS || — || align=right | 1.2 km || 
|-id=255 bgcolor=#fefefe
| 272255 ||  || — || August 28, 2005 || Siding Spring || SSS || — || align=right | 1.5 km || 
|-id=256 bgcolor=#fefefe
| 272256 ||  || — || August 30, 2005 || Kitt Peak || Spacewatch || — || align=right | 1.0 km || 
|-id=257 bgcolor=#fefefe
| 272257 ||  || — || August 30, 2005 || Kitt Peak || Spacewatch || V || align=right data-sort-value="0.75" | 750 m || 
|-id=258 bgcolor=#fefefe
| 272258 ||  || — || August 31, 2005 || Kitt Peak || Spacewatch || V || align=right data-sort-value="0.90" | 900 m || 
|-id=259 bgcolor=#fefefe
| 272259 ||  || — || August 28, 2005 || Siding Spring || SSS || FLO || align=right data-sort-value="0.80" | 800 m || 
|-id=260 bgcolor=#fefefe
| 272260 ||  || — || August 31, 2005 || Palomar || NEAT || — || align=right | 1.2 km || 
|-id=261 bgcolor=#fefefe
| 272261 ||  || — || August 29, 2005 || Palomar || NEAT || — || align=right | 1.4 km || 
|-id=262 bgcolor=#fefefe
| 272262 ||  || — || August 29, 2005 || Palomar || NEAT || FLO || align=right data-sort-value="0.91" | 910 m || 
|-id=263 bgcolor=#fefefe
| 272263 ||  || — || August 29, 2005 || Palomar || NEAT || — || align=right | 1.5 km || 
|-id=264 bgcolor=#fefefe
| 272264 ||  || — || August 30, 2005 || Kitt Peak || Spacewatch || V || align=right data-sort-value="0.69" | 690 m || 
|-id=265 bgcolor=#fefefe
| 272265 ||  || — || August 30, 2005 || Kitt Peak || Spacewatch || V || align=right data-sort-value="0.63" | 630 m || 
|-id=266 bgcolor=#fefefe
| 272266 ||  || — || August 27, 2005 || Anderson Mesa || LONEOS || — || align=right | 1.1 km || 
|-id=267 bgcolor=#fefefe
| 272267 ||  || — || August 30, 2005 || Kitt Peak || Spacewatch || V || align=right data-sort-value="0.73" | 730 m || 
|-id=268 bgcolor=#E9E9E9
| 272268 ||  || — || August 31, 2005 || Kitt Peak || Spacewatch || — || align=right data-sort-value="0.95" | 950 m || 
|-id=269 bgcolor=#fefefe
| 272269 ||  || — || September 2, 2005 || Campo Imperatore || CINEOS || FLO || align=right data-sort-value="0.88" | 880 m || 
|-id=270 bgcolor=#fefefe
| 272270 ||  || — || September 5, 2005 || Altschwendt || Altschwendt Obs. || — || align=right | 1.2 km || 
|-id=271 bgcolor=#fefefe
| 272271 ||  || — || September 8, 2005 || Socorro || LINEAR || — || align=right | 1.4 km || 
|-id=272 bgcolor=#fefefe
| 272272 ||  || — || September 8, 2005 || Socorro || LINEAR || — || align=right | 1.5 km || 
|-id=273 bgcolor=#fefefe
| 272273 ||  || — || September 8, 2005 || Socorro || LINEAR || — || align=right data-sort-value="0.93" | 930 m || 
|-id=274 bgcolor=#fefefe
| 272274 ||  || — || September 8, 2005 || Socorro || LINEAR || NYS || align=right data-sort-value="0.82" | 820 m || 
|-id=275 bgcolor=#fefefe
| 272275 ||  || — || September 8, 2005 || Socorro || LINEAR || — || align=right | 1.4 km || 
|-id=276 bgcolor=#fefefe
| 272276 ||  || — || September 8, 2005 || Socorro || LINEAR || — || align=right | 1.1 km || 
|-id=277 bgcolor=#fefefe
| 272277 ||  || — || September 8, 2005 || Socorro || LINEAR || — || align=right | 1.2 km || 
|-id=278 bgcolor=#fefefe
| 272278 ||  || — || September 8, 2005 || Socorro || LINEAR || — || align=right | 2.9 km || 
|-id=279 bgcolor=#E9E9E9
| 272279 ||  || — || September 12, 2005 || Socorro || LINEAR || — || align=right | 3.5 km || 
|-id=280 bgcolor=#E9E9E9
| 272280 ||  || — || September 13, 2005 || Kitt Peak || Spacewatch || HOF || align=right | 3.9 km || 
|-id=281 bgcolor=#fefefe
| 272281 ||  || — || September 3, 2005 || Palomar || NEAT || V || align=right data-sort-value="0.90" | 900 m || 
|-id=282 bgcolor=#fefefe
| 272282 || 2005 SX || — || September 22, 2005 || Siding Spring || R. H. McNaught || V || align=right | 1.0 km || 
|-id=283 bgcolor=#fefefe
| 272283 ||  || — || September 23, 2005 || Catalina || CSS || — || align=right | 1.3 km || 
|-id=284 bgcolor=#E9E9E9
| 272284 ||  || — || September 23, 2005 || Kitt Peak || Spacewatch || — || align=right | 1.1 km || 
|-id=285 bgcolor=#E9E9E9
| 272285 ||  || — || September 23, 2005 || Kitt Peak || Spacewatch || — || align=right | 1.0 km || 
|-id=286 bgcolor=#fefefe
| 272286 ||  || — || September 24, 2005 || Kitt Peak || Spacewatch || — || align=right | 1.1 km || 
|-id=287 bgcolor=#FA8072
| 272287 ||  || — || September 25, 2005 || Catalina || CSS || — || align=right | 1.3 km || 
|-id=288 bgcolor=#fefefe
| 272288 ||  || — || September 23, 2005 || Kitt Peak || Spacewatch || — || align=right data-sort-value="0.97" | 970 m || 
|-id=289 bgcolor=#fefefe
| 272289 ||  || — || September 24, 2005 || Kitt Peak || Spacewatch || — || align=right data-sort-value="0.86" | 860 m || 
|-id=290 bgcolor=#fefefe
| 272290 ||  || — || September 24, 2005 || Kitt Peak || Spacewatch || — || align=right | 1.2 km || 
|-id=291 bgcolor=#fefefe
| 272291 ||  || — || September 24, 2005 || Anderson Mesa || LONEOS || — || align=right | 1.4 km || 
|-id=292 bgcolor=#fefefe
| 272292 ||  || — || September 26, 2005 || Kitt Peak || Spacewatch || MAS || align=right data-sort-value="0.78" | 780 m || 
|-id=293 bgcolor=#fefefe
| 272293 ||  || — || September 25, 2005 || Kitt Peak || Spacewatch || NYS || align=right | 1.2 km || 
|-id=294 bgcolor=#fefefe
| 272294 ||  || — || September 25, 2005 || Kitt Peak || Spacewatch || FLO || align=right | 1.0 km || 
|-id=295 bgcolor=#fefefe
| 272295 ||  || — || September 21, 2005 || Palomar || NEAT || PHO || align=right | 1.6 km || 
|-id=296 bgcolor=#fefefe
| 272296 ||  || — || September 24, 2005 || Kitt Peak || Spacewatch || V || align=right | 1.1 km || 
|-id=297 bgcolor=#d6d6d6
| 272297 ||  || — || September 24, 2005 || Anderson Mesa || LONEOS || 3:2 || align=right | 6.4 km || 
|-id=298 bgcolor=#fefefe
| 272298 ||  || — || September 24, 2005 || Anderson Mesa || LONEOS || FLO || align=right data-sort-value="0.84" | 840 m || 
|-id=299 bgcolor=#fefefe
| 272299 ||  || — || September 25, 2005 || Catalina || CSS || FLO || align=right data-sort-value="0.92" | 920 m || 
|-id=300 bgcolor=#fefefe
| 272300 ||  || — || September 23, 2005 || Kitt Peak || Spacewatch || V || align=right | 1.1 km || 
|}

272301–272400 

|-bgcolor=#fefefe
| 272301 ||  || — || September 23, 2005 || Kitt Peak || Spacewatch || FLO || align=right | 1.1 km || 
|-id=302 bgcolor=#fefefe
| 272302 ||  || — || September 23, 2005 || Catalina || CSS || — || align=right data-sort-value="0.98" | 980 m || 
|-id=303 bgcolor=#fefefe
| 272303 ||  || — || September 23, 2005 || Catalina || CSS || NYS || align=right data-sort-value="0.92" | 920 m || 
|-id=304 bgcolor=#fefefe
| 272304 ||  || — || September 23, 2005 || Catalina || CSS || V || align=right data-sort-value="0.76" | 760 m || 
|-id=305 bgcolor=#fefefe
| 272305 ||  || — || September 23, 2005 || Kitt Peak || Spacewatch || NYS || align=right data-sort-value="0.96" | 960 m || 
|-id=306 bgcolor=#E9E9E9
| 272306 ||  || — || September 23, 2005 || Kitt Peak || Spacewatch || — || align=right | 1.6 km || 
|-id=307 bgcolor=#fefefe
| 272307 ||  || — || September 23, 2005 || Kitt Peak || Spacewatch || V || align=right data-sort-value="0.74" | 740 m || 
|-id=308 bgcolor=#E9E9E9
| 272308 ||  || — || September 24, 2005 || Kitt Peak || Spacewatch || — || align=right data-sort-value="0.98" | 980 m || 
|-id=309 bgcolor=#fefefe
| 272309 ||  || — || September 25, 2005 || Kitt Peak || Spacewatch || — || align=right | 1.2 km || 
|-id=310 bgcolor=#fefefe
| 272310 ||  || — || September 26, 2005 || Kitt Peak || Spacewatch || V || align=right data-sort-value="0.68" | 680 m || 
|-id=311 bgcolor=#d6d6d6
| 272311 ||  || — || September 26, 2005 || Kitt Peak || Spacewatch || — || align=right | 2.4 km || 
|-id=312 bgcolor=#fefefe
| 272312 ||  || — || September 26, 2005 || Kitt Peak || Spacewatch || FLO || align=right data-sort-value="0.82" | 820 m || 
|-id=313 bgcolor=#fefefe
| 272313 ||  || — || September 26, 2005 || Catalina || CSS || — || align=right | 2.3 km || 
|-id=314 bgcolor=#fefefe
| 272314 ||  || — || September 27, 2005 || Kitt Peak || Spacewatch || MAS || align=right | 1.1 km || 
|-id=315 bgcolor=#E9E9E9
| 272315 ||  || — || September 27, 2005 || Socorro || LINEAR || — || align=right | 1.5 km || 
|-id=316 bgcolor=#E9E9E9
| 272316 ||  || — || September 27, 2005 || Junk Bond || D. Healy || — || align=right | 1.7 km || 
|-id=317 bgcolor=#fefefe
| 272317 ||  || — || September 23, 2005 || Catalina || CSS || — || align=right data-sort-value="0.81" | 810 m || 
|-id=318 bgcolor=#fefefe
| 272318 ||  || — || September 23, 2005 || Catalina || CSS || NYS || align=right data-sort-value="0.92" | 920 m || 
|-id=319 bgcolor=#fefefe
| 272319 ||  || — || September 23, 2005 || Kitt Peak || Spacewatch || MAS || align=right data-sort-value="0.88" | 880 m || 
|-id=320 bgcolor=#fefefe
| 272320 ||  || — || September 24, 2005 || Kitt Peak || Spacewatch || V || align=right data-sort-value="0.81" | 810 m || 
|-id=321 bgcolor=#fefefe
| 272321 ||  || — || September 24, 2005 || Kitt Peak || Spacewatch || — || align=right data-sort-value="0.82" | 820 m || 
|-id=322 bgcolor=#fefefe
| 272322 ||  || — || September 24, 2005 || Kitt Peak || Spacewatch || — || align=right | 1.0 km || 
|-id=323 bgcolor=#fefefe
| 272323 ||  || — || September 24, 2005 || Kitt Peak || Spacewatch || — || align=right data-sort-value="0.73" | 730 m || 
|-id=324 bgcolor=#fefefe
| 272324 ||  || — || September 24, 2005 || Kitt Peak || Spacewatch || — || align=right | 1.0 km || 
|-id=325 bgcolor=#fefefe
| 272325 ||  || — || September 24, 2005 || Kitt Peak || Spacewatch || FLO || align=right data-sort-value="0.84" | 840 m || 
|-id=326 bgcolor=#fefefe
| 272326 ||  || — || September 24, 2005 || Kitt Peak || Spacewatch || MAS || align=right data-sort-value="0.78" | 780 m || 
|-id=327 bgcolor=#fefefe
| 272327 ||  || — || September 25, 2005 || Palomar || NEAT || PHO || align=right | 2.0 km || 
|-id=328 bgcolor=#fefefe
| 272328 ||  || — || September 25, 2005 || Palomar || NEAT || NYS || align=right | 1.0 km || 
|-id=329 bgcolor=#fefefe
| 272329 ||  || — || September 25, 2005 || Kitt Peak || Spacewatch || — || align=right | 1.2 km || 
|-id=330 bgcolor=#fefefe
| 272330 ||  || — || September 25, 2005 || Kitt Peak || Spacewatch || V || align=right data-sort-value="0.82" | 820 m || 
|-id=331 bgcolor=#E9E9E9
| 272331 ||  || — || September 26, 2005 || Kitt Peak || Spacewatch || — || align=right data-sort-value="0.79" | 790 m || 
|-id=332 bgcolor=#fefefe
| 272332 ||  || — || September 26, 2005 || Kitt Peak || Spacewatch || — || align=right | 1.1 km || 
|-id=333 bgcolor=#fefefe
| 272333 ||  || — || September 26, 2005 || Palomar || NEAT || — || align=right | 1.1 km || 
|-id=334 bgcolor=#fefefe
| 272334 ||  || — || September 27, 2005 || Kitt Peak || Spacewatch || — || align=right | 1.1 km || 
|-id=335 bgcolor=#fefefe
| 272335 ||  || — || September 28, 2005 || Palomar || NEAT || — || align=right | 1.3 km || 
|-id=336 bgcolor=#fefefe
| 272336 ||  || — || September 28, 2005 || Palomar || NEAT || — || align=right | 1.2 km || 
|-id=337 bgcolor=#fefefe
| 272337 ||  || — || September 28, 2005 || Palomar || NEAT || — || align=right | 1.2 km || 
|-id=338 bgcolor=#fefefe
| 272338 ||  || — || September 28, 2005 || Palomar || NEAT || V || align=right data-sort-value="0.73" | 730 m || 
|-id=339 bgcolor=#fefefe
| 272339 ||  || — || September 29, 2005 || Anderson Mesa || LONEOS || NYS || align=right data-sort-value="0.93" | 930 m || 
|-id=340 bgcolor=#fefefe
| 272340 ||  || — || September 29, 2005 || Anderson Mesa || LONEOS || — || align=right | 1.1 km || 
|-id=341 bgcolor=#fefefe
| 272341 ||  || — || September 29, 2005 || Palomar || NEAT || — || align=right data-sort-value="0.97" | 970 m || 
|-id=342 bgcolor=#fefefe
| 272342 ||  || — || September 29, 2005 || Palomar || NEAT || — || align=right | 1.1 km || 
|-id=343 bgcolor=#fefefe
| 272343 ||  || — || September 29, 2005 || Palomar || NEAT || NYS || align=right data-sort-value="0.93" | 930 m || 
|-id=344 bgcolor=#fefefe
| 272344 ||  || — || September 29, 2005 || Mount Lemmon || Mount Lemmon Survey || NYS || align=right data-sort-value="0.86" | 860 m || 
|-id=345 bgcolor=#fefefe
| 272345 ||  || — || September 30, 2005 || Junk Bond || D. Healy || FLO || align=right data-sort-value="0.99" | 990 m || 
|-id=346 bgcolor=#fefefe
| 272346 ||  || — || September 25, 2005 || Kitt Peak || Spacewatch || — || align=right data-sort-value="0.83" | 830 m || 
|-id=347 bgcolor=#fefefe
| 272347 ||  || — || September 25, 2005 || Kitt Peak || Spacewatch || — || align=right data-sort-value="0.91" | 910 m || 
|-id=348 bgcolor=#fefefe
| 272348 ||  || — || September 25, 2005 || Kitt Peak || Spacewatch || V || align=right | 1.0 km || 
|-id=349 bgcolor=#fefefe
| 272349 ||  || — || September 25, 2005 || Kitt Peak || Spacewatch || — || align=right data-sort-value="0.95" | 950 m || 
|-id=350 bgcolor=#fefefe
| 272350 ||  || — || September 25, 2005 || Kitt Peak || Spacewatch || SUL || align=right | 2.0 km || 
|-id=351 bgcolor=#fefefe
| 272351 ||  || — || September 25, 2005 || Kitt Peak || Spacewatch || FLO || align=right | 1.1 km || 
|-id=352 bgcolor=#fefefe
| 272352 ||  || — || September 25, 2005 || Kitt Peak || Spacewatch || SUL || align=right | 1.9 km || 
|-id=353 bgcolor=#fefefe
| 272353 ||  || — || September 27, 2005 || Kitt Peak || Spacewatch || — || align=right | 1.1 km || 
|-id=354 bgcolor=#FA8072
| 272354 ||  || — || September 27, 2005 || Palomar || NEAT || — || align=right | 1.4 km || 
|-id=355 bgcolor=#E9E9E9
| 272355 ||  || — || September 27, 2005 || Palomar || NEAT || — || align=right | 2.6 km || 
|-id=356 bgcolor=#fefefe
| 272356 ||  || — || September 28, 2005 || Palomar || NEAT || NYS || align=right data-sort-value="0.72" | 720 m || 
|-id=357 bgcolor=#fefefe
| 272357 ||  || — || September 28, 2005 || Palomar || NEAT || ERI || align=right | 2.0 km || 
|-id=358 bgcolor=#fefefe
| 272358 ||  || — || September 28, 2005 || Palomar || NEAT || — || align=right | 3.0 km || 
|-id=359 bgcolor=#fefefe
| 272359 ||  || — || September 29, 2005 || Kitt Peak || Spacewatch || — || align=right | 1.2 km || 
|-id=360 bgcolor=#fefefe
| 272360 ||  || — || September 29, 2005 || Kitt Peak || Spacewatch || V || align=right data-sort-value="0.77" | 770 m || 
|-id=361 bgcolor=#fefefe
| 272361 ||  || — || September 29, 2005 || Kitt Peak || Spacewatch || — || align=right | 1.4 km || 
|-id=362 bgcolor=#fefefe
| 272362 ||  || — || September 29, 2005 || Anderson Mesa || LONEOS || NYS || align=right | 1.00 km || 
|-id=363 bgcolor=#fefefe
| 272363 ||  || — || September 29, 2005 || Kitt Peak || Spacewatch || — || align=right | 1.2 km || 
|-id=364 bgcolor=#fefefe
| 272364 ||  || — || September 30, 2005 || Kitt Peak || Spacewatch || NYS || align=right data-sort-value="0.68" | 680 m || 
|-id=365 bgcolor=#E9E9E9
| 272365 ||  || — || September 30, 2005 || Kitt Peak || Spacewatch || — || align=right | 1.0 km || 
|-id=366 bgcolor=#fefefe
| 272366 ||  || — || September 30, 2005 || Mount Lemmon || Mount Lemmon Survey || — || align=right data-sort-value="0.97" | 970 m || 
|-id=367 bgcolor=#fefefe
| 272367 ||  || — || September 30, 2005 || Palomar || NEAT || — || align=right | 1.2 km || 
|-id=368 bgcolor=#fefefe
| 272368 ||  || — || September 30, 2005 || Anderson Mesa || LONEOS || NYS || align=right data-sort-value="0.72" | 720 m || 
|-id=369 bgcolor=#fefefe
| 272369 ||  || — || September 30, 2005 || Kitt Peak || Spacewatch || — || align=right data-sort-value="0.89" | 890 m || 
|-id=370 bgcolor=#fefefe
| 272370 ||  || — || September 30, 2005 || Palomar || NEAT || V || align=right data-sort-value="0.82" | 820 m || 
|-id=371 bgcolor=#fefefe
| 272371 ||  || — || September 30, 2005 || Mount Lemmon || Mount Lemmon Survey || — || align=right | 1.1 km || 
|-id=372 bgcolor=#E9E9E9
| 272372 ||  || — || September 30, 2005 || Anderson Mesa || LONEOS || — || align=right | 1.4 km || 
|-id=373 bgcolor=#FA8072
| 272373 ||  || — || September 30, 2005 || Palomar || NEAT || — || align=right | 1.0 km || 
|-id=374 bgcolor=#fefefe
| 272374 ||  || — || September 30, 2005 || Mount Lemmon || Mount Lemmon Survey || KLI || align=right | 2.7 km || 
|-id=375 bgcolor=#E9E9E9
| 272375 ||  || — || September 30, 2005 || Mount Lemmon || Mount Lemmon Survey || — || align=right | 1.5 km || 
|-id=376 bgcolor=#fefefe
| 272376 ||  || — || September 30, 2005 || Palomar || NEAT || NYS || align=right data-sort-value="0.97" | 970 m || 
|-id=377 bgcolor=#E9E9E9
| 272377 ||  || — || September 29, 2005 || Catalina || CSS || — || align=right | 2.3 km || 
|-id=378 bgcolor=#E9E9E9
| 272378 ||  || — || September 29, 2005 || Catalina || CSS || — || align=right | 1.8 km || 
|-id=379 bgcolor=#fefefe
| 272379 ||  || — || September 30, 2005 || Mount Lemmon || Mount Lemmon Survey || V || align=right data-sort-value="0.85" | 850 m || 
|-id=380 bgcolor=#fefefe
| 272380 ||  || — || September 29, 2005 || Mount Lemmon || Mount Lemmon Survey || MAS || align=right data-sort-value="0.82" | 820 m || 
|-id=381 bgcolor=#fefefe
| 272381 ||  || — || September 30, 2005 || Kitt Peak || Spacewatch || — || align=right data-sort-value="0.91" | 910 m || 
|-id=382 bgcolor=#E9E9E9
| 272382 ||  || — || September 30, 2005 || Kitt Peak || Spacewatch || — || align=right data-sort-value="0.93" | 930 m || 
|-id=383 bgcolor=#fefefe
| 272383 ||  || — || September 30, 2005 || Mount Lemmon || Mount Lemmon Survey || V || align=right data-sort-value="0.71" | 710 m || 
|-id=384 bgcolor=#E9E9E9
| 272384 ||  || — || September 29, 2005 || Kitt Peak || Spacewatch || — || align=right data-sort-value="0.96" | 960 m || 
|-id=385 bgcolor=#fefefe
| 272385 ||  || — || September 22, 2005 || Palomar || NEAT || NYS || align=right | 1.0 km || 
|-id=386 bgcolor=#fefefe
| 272386 ||  || — || September 22, 2005 || Palomar || NEAT || MAS || align=right data-sort-value="0.93" | 930 m || 
|-id=387 bgcolor=#fefefe
| 272387 ||  || — || September 22, 2005 || Palomar || NEAT || V || align=right data-sort-value="0.86" | 860 m || 
|-id=388 bgcolor=#E9E9E9
| 272388 ||  || — || September 29, 2005 || Kitt Peak || Spacewatch || — || align=right | 1.2 km || 
|-id=389 bgcolor=#E9E9E9
| 272389 ||  || — || September 29, 2005 || Catalina || CSS || — || align=right | 1.4 km || 
|-id=390 bgcolor=#fefefe
| 272390 ||  || — || September 30, 2005 || Anderson Mesa || LONEOS || — || align=right | 1.4 km || 
|-id=391 bgcolor=#fefefe
| 272391 ||  || — || September 30, 2005 || Palomar || NEAT || FLO || align=right data-sort-value="0.97" | 970 m || 
|-id=392 bgcolor=#E9E9E9
| 272392 ||  || — || September 24, 2005 || Apache Point || A. C. Becker || — || align=right data-sort-value="0.96" | 960 m || 
|-id=393 bgcolor=#E9E9E9
| 272393 ||  || — || September 27, 2005 || Apache Point || A. C. Becker || — || align=right | 1.7 km || 
|-id=394 bgcolor=#E9E9E9
| 272394 ||  || — || September 27, 2005 || Apache Point || A. C. Becker || — || align=right | 1.2 km || 
|-id=395 bgcolor=#E9E9E9
| 272395 ||  || — || September 29, 2005 || Kitt Peak || Spacewatch || — || align=right | 1.2 km || 
|-id=396 bgcolor=#fefefe
| 272396 ||  || — || September 30, 2005 || Kitt Peak || Spacewatch || — || align=right | 2.6 km || 
|-id=397 bgcolor=#E9E9E9
| 272397 ||  || — || October 1, 2005 || Catalina || CSS || — || align=right | 1.2 km || 
|-id=398 bgcolor=#fefefe
| 272398 ||  || — || October 1, 2005 || Catalina || CSS || FLO || align=right data-sort-value="0.76" | 760 m || 
|-id=399 bgcolor=#fefefe
| 272399 ||  || — || October 1, 2005 || Catalina || CSS || V || align=right | 1.1 km || 
|-id=400 bgcolor=#fefefe
| 272400 ||  || — || October 1, 2005 || Catalina || CSS || V || align=right | 1.0 km || 
|}

272401–272500 

|-bgcolor=#E9E9E9
| 272401 ||  || — || October 1, 2005 || Catalina || CSS || — || align=right data-sort-value="0.98" | 980 m || 
|-id=402 bgcolor=#fefefe
| 272402 ||  || — || October 1, 2005 || Kitt Peak || Spacewatch || — || align=right data-sort-value="0.71" | 710 m || 
|-id=403 bgcolor=#fefefe
| 272403 ||  || — || October 1, 2005 || Kitt Peak || Spacewatch || NYS || align=right data-sort-value="0.99" | 990 m || 
|-id=404 bgcolor=#fefefe
| 272404 ||  || — || October 1, 2005 || Mount Lemmon || Mount Lemmon Survey || — || align=right data-sort-value="0.86" | 860 m || 
|-id=405 bgcolor=#E9E9E9
| 272405 ||  || — || October 1, 2005 || Mount Lemmon || Mount Lemmon Survey || MIS || align=right | 2.8 km || 
|-id=406 bgcolor=#fefefe
| 272406 ||  || — || October 1, 2005 || Mount Lemmon || Mount Lemmon Survey || FLO || align=right data-sort-value="0.81" | 810 m || 
|-id=407 bgcolor=#fefefe
| 272407 ||  || — || October 1, 2005 || Kitt Peak || Spacewatch || — || align=right | 1.0 km || 
|-id=408 bgcolor=#fefefe
| 272408 ||  || — || October 1, 2005 || Kitt Peak || Spacewatch || — || align=right data-sort-value="0.84" | 840 m || 
|-id=409 bgcolor=#fefefe
| 272409 ||  || — || October 1, 2005 || Mount Lemmon || Mount Lemmon Survey || — || align=right data-sort-value="0.98" | 980 m || 
|-id=410 bgcolor=#fefefe
| 272410 ||  || — || October 1, 2005 || Kitt Peak || Spacewatch || V || align=right data-sort-value="0.85" | 850 m || 
|-id=411 bgcolor=#fefefe
| 272411 ||  || — || October 3, 2005 || Kitt Peak || Spacewatch || — || align=right | 1.1 km || 
|-id=412 bgcolor=#fefefe
| 272412 ||  || — || October 10, 2005 || Catalina || CSS || V || align=right | 1.0 km || 
|-id=413 bgcolor=#E9E9E9
| 272413 ||  || — || October 1, 2005 || Mount Lemmon || Mount Lemmon Survey || — || align=right | 1.2 km || 
|-id=414 bgcolor=#fefefe
| 272414 ||  || — || October 1, 2005 || Mount Lemmon || Mount Lemmon Survey || NYS || align=right | 1.0 km || 
|-id=415 bgcolor=#fefefe
| 272415 ||  || — || October 1, 2005 || Kitt Peak || Spacewatch || MAS || align=right data-sort-value="0.75" | 750 m || 
|-id=416 bgcolor=#fefefe
| 272416 ||  || — || October 7, 2005 || Anderson Mesa || LONEOS || FLO || align=right data-sort-value="0.83" | 830 m || 
|-id=417 bgcolor=#d6d6d6
| 272417 ||  || — || October 5, 2005 || Catalina || CSS || HIL3:2 || align=right | 8.9 km || 
|-id=418 bgcolor=#fefefe
| 272418 ||  || — || October 6, 2005 || Mount Lemmon || Mount Lemmon Survey || — || align=right data-sort-value="0.94" | 940 m || 
|-id=419 bgcolor=#fefefe
| 272419 ||  || — || October 7, 2005 || Catalina || CSS || — || align=right | 1.2 km || 
|-id=420 bgcolor=#fefefe
| 272420 ||  || — || October 8, 2005 || Socorro || LINEAR || — || align=right | 1.5 km || 
|-id=421 bgcolor=#fefefe
| 272421 ||  || — || October 8, 2005 || Socorro || LINEAR || — || align=right | 1.2 km || 
|-id=422 bgcolor=#fefefe
| 272422 ||  || — || October 4, 2005 || Mount Lemmon || Mount Lemmon Survey || MAS || align=right data-sort-value="0.89" | 890 m || 
|-id=423 bgcolor=#fefefe
| 272423 ||  || — || October 7, 2005 || Kitt Peak || Spacewatch || — || align=right | 1.0 km || 
|-id=424 bgcolor=#fefefe
| 272424 ||  || — || October 7, 2005 || Mount Lemmon || Mount Lemmon Survey || — || align=right | 1.1 km || 
|-id=425 bgcolor=#fefefe
| 272425 ||  || — || October 7, 2005 || Kitt Peak || Spacewatch || — || align=right data-sort-value="0.87" | 870 m || 
|-id=426 bgcolor=#fefefe
| 272426 ||  || — || October 7, 2005 || Kitt Peak || Spacewatch || — || align=right | 1.1 km || 
|-id=427 bgcolor=#fefefe
| 272427 ||  || — || October 6, 2005 || Kitt Peak || Spacewatch || — || align=right | 1.1 km || 
|-id=428 bgcolor=#fefefe
| 272428 ||  || — || October 8, 2005 || Kitt Peak || Spacewatch || NYS || align=right data-sort-value="0.84" | 840 m || 
|-id=429 bgcolor=#E9E9E9
| 272429 ||  || — || October 11, 2005 || Kitt Peak || Spacewatch || — || align=right | 1.6 km || 
|-id=430 bgcolor=#E9E9E9
| 272430 ||  || — || October 11, 2005 || Kitt Peak || Spacewatch || — || align=right | 2.9 km || 
|-id=431 bgcolor=#fefefe
| 272431 ||  || — || October 8, 2005 || Catalina || CSS || FLO || align=right | 1.1 km || 
|-id=432 bgcolor=#fefefe
| 272432 ||  || — || October 9, 2005 || Kitt Peak || Spacewatch || V || align=right data-sort-value="0.82" | 820 m || 
|-id=433 bgcolor=#fefefe
| 272433 ||  || — || October 9, 2005 || Kitt Peak || Spacewatch || — || align=right | 1.2 km || 
|-id=434 bgcolor=#fefefe
| 272434 ||  || — || October 9, 2005 || Kitt Peak || Spacewatch || MAS || align=right | 1.1 km || 
|-id=435 bgcolor=#d6d6d6
| 272435 ||  || — || October 10, 2005 || Anderson Mesa || LONEOS || EOS || align=right | 2.5 km || 
|-id=436 bgcolor=#E9E9E9
| 272436 ||  || — || October 12, 2005 || Kitt Peak || Spacewatch || — || align=right | 1.6 km || 
|-id=437 bgcolor=#fefefe
| 272437 ||  || — || October 1, 2005 || Anderson Mesa || LONEOS || V || align=right data-sort-value="0.89" | 890 m || 
|-id=438 bgcolor=#fefefe
| 272438 ||  || — || October 1, 2005 || Kitt Peak || Spacewatch || — || align=right data-sort-value="0.95" | 950 m || 
|-id=439 bgcolor=#fefefe
| 272439 ||  || — || October 9, 2005 || Kitt Peak || Spacewatch || NYS || align=right data-sort-value="0.86" | 860 m || 
|-id=440 bgcolor=#E9E9E9
| 272440 ||  || — || October 20, 2005 || Palomar || NEAT || — || align=right | 2.1 km || 
|-id=441 bgcolor=#d6d6d6
| 272441 ||  || — || October 22, 2005 || Junk Bond || D. Healy || — || align=right | 3.2 km || 
|-id=442 bgcolor=#fefefe
| 272442 ||  || — || October 21, 2005 || Palomar || NEAT || V || align=right data-sort-value="0.82" | 820 m || 
|-id=443 bgcolor=#E9E9E9
| 272443 ||  || — || October 22, 2005 || Kitt Peak || Spacewatch || — || align=right data-sort-value="0.91" | 910 m || 
|-id=444 bgcolor=#E9E9E9
| 272444 ||  || — || October 23, 2005 || Kitt Peak || Spacewatch || — || align=right | 1.1 km || 
|-id=445 bgcolor=#fefefe
| 272445 ||  || — || October 22, 2005 || Kitt Peak || Spacewatch || — || align=right data-sort-value="0.90" | 900 m || 
|-id=446 bgcolor=#fefefe
| 272446 ||  || — || October 22, 2005 || Kitt Peak || Spacewatch || MAS || align=right data-sort-value="0.74" | 740 m || 
|-id=447 bgcolor=#d6d6d6
| 272447 ||  || — || October 22, 2005 || Kitt Peak || Spacewatch || — || align=right | 5.5 km || 
|-id=448 bgcolor=#fefefe
| 272448 ||  || — || October 23, 2005 || Kitt Peak || Spacewatch || — || align=right data-sort-value="0.90" | 900 m || 
|-id=449 bgcolor=#fefefe
| 272449 ||  || — || October 23, 2005 || Kitt Peak || Spacewatch || V || align=right data-sort-value="0.94" | 940 m || 
|-id=450 bgcolor=#E9E9E9
| 272450 ||  || — || October 23, 2005 || Kitt Peak || Spacewatch || — || align=right data-sort-value="0.85" | 850 m || 
|-id=451 bgcolor=#d6d6d6
| 272451 ||  || — || October 1, 2000 || Socorro || LINEAR || KAR || align=right | 1.7 km || 
|-id=452 bgcolor=#E9E9E9
| 272452 ||  || — || October 24, 2005 || Kitt Peak || Spacewatch || — || align=right | 1.9 km || 
|-id=453 bgcolor=#fefefe
| 272453 ||  || — || October 24, 2005 || Kitt Peak || Spacewatch || MAS || align=right data-sort-value="0.82" | 820 m || 
|-id=454 bgcolor=#E9E9E9
| 272454 ||  || — || October 24, 2005 || Kitt Peak || Spacewatch || — || align=right | 1.5 km || 
|-id=455 bgcolor=#fefefe
| 272455 ||  || — || October 23, 2005 || Catalina || CSS || — || align=right | 1.3 km || 
|-id=456 bgcolor=#E9E9E9
| 272456 ||  || — || October 23, 2005 || Catalina || CSS || — || align=right | 1.9 km || 
|-id=457 bgcolor=#fefefe
| 272457 ||  || — || October 23, 2005 || Catalina || CSS || — || align=right | 1.1 km || 
|-id=458 bgcolor=#E9E9E9
| 272458 ||  || — || October 23, 2005 || Catalina || CSS || — || align=right | 1.1 km || 
|-id=459 bgcolor=#fefefe
| 272459 ||  || — || October 23, 2005 || Catalina || CSS || — || align=right | 1.4 km || 
|-id=460 bgcolor=#fefefe
| 272460 ||  || — || October 23, 2005 || Catalina || CSS || V || align=right | 1.00 km || 
|-id=461 bgcolor=#E9E9E9
| 272461 ||  || — || October 23, 2005 || Catalina || CSS || ADE || align=right | 2.9 km || 
|-id=462 bgcolor=#E9E9E9
| 272462 ||  || — || October 24, 2005 || Anderson Mesa || LONEOS || EUN || align=right | 1.4 km || 
|-id=463 bgcolor=#fefefe
| 272463 ||  || — || October 25, 2005 || Anderson Mesa || LONEOS || NYS || align=right | 1.1 km || 
|-id=464 bgcolor=#fefefe
| 272464 ||  || — || October 25, 2005 || Mount Lemmon || Mount Lemmon Survey || CLA || align=right | 1.8 km || 
|-id=465 bgcolor=#E9E9E9
| 272465 ||  || — || October 22, 2005 || Palomar || NEAT || — || align=right | 1.9 km || 
|-id=466 bgcolor=#E9E9E9
| 272466 ||  || — || October 22, 2005 || Palomar || NEAT || — || align=right | 2.6 km || 
|-id=467 bgcolor=#fefefe
| 272467 ||  || — || October 22, 2005 || Catalina || CSS || — || align=right | 1.4 km || 
|-id=468 bgcolor=#E9E9E9
| 272468 ||  || — || October 23, 2005 || Catalina || CSS || — || align=right | 1.1 km || 
|-id=469 bgcolor=#E9E9E9
| 272469 ||  || — || October 24, 2005 || Palomar || NEAT || — || align=right | 2.0 km || 
|-id=470 bgcolor=#E9E9E9
| 272470 ||  || — || October 24, 2005 || Kitt Peak || Spacewatch || — || align=right | 1.0 km || 
|-id=471 bgcolor=#E9E9E9
| 272471 ||  || — || October 24, 2005 || Kitt Peak || Spacewatch || — || align=right | 2.0 km || 
|-id=472 bgcolor=#E9E9E9
| 272472 ||  || — || October 24, 2005 || Palomar || NEAT || — || align=right | 2.0 km || 
|-id=473 bgcolor=#E9E9E9
| 272473 ||  || — || October 25, 2005 || Kitt Peak || Spacewatch || — || align=right | 1.5 km || 
|-id=474 bgcolor=#fefefe
| 272474 ||  || — || October 25, 2005 || Catalina || CSS || V || align=right | 1.0 km || 
|-id=475 bgcolor=#FA8072
| 272475 ||  || — || October 25, 2005 || Catalina || CSS || — || align=right | 1.4 km || 
|-id=476 bgcolor=#fefefe
| 272476 ||  || — || October 22, 2005 || Kitt Peak || Spacewatch || — || align=right | 1.0 km || 
|-id=477 bgcolor=#fefefe
| 272477 ||  || — || October 22, 2005 || Kitt Peak || Spacewatch || — || align=right | 1.1 km || 
|-id=478 bgcolor=#fefefe
| 272478 ||  || — || October 22, 2005 || Kitt Peak || Spacewatch || — || align=right data-sort-value="0.94" | 940 m || 
|-id=479 bgcolor=#fefefe
| 272479 ||  || — || October 22, 2005 || Kitt Peak || Spacewatch || V || align=right data-sort-value="0.89" | 890 m || 
|-id=480 bgcolor=#fefefe
| 272480 ||  || — || October 22, 2005 || Kitt Peak || Spacewatch || NYS || align=right data-sort-value="0.72" | 720 m || 
|-id=481 bgcolor=#E9E9E9
| 272481 ||  || — || October 22, 2005 || Kitt Peak || Spacewatch || — || align=right | 2.2 km || 
|-id=482 bgcolor=#fefefe
| 272482 ||  || — || October 22, 2005 || Catalina || CSS || — || align=right | 1.6 km || 
|-id=483 bgcolor=#E9E9E9
| 272483 ||  || — || October 22, 2005 || Kitt Peak || Spacewatch || NEM || align=right | 2.6 km || 
|-id=484 bgcolor=#E9E9E9
| 272484 ||  || — || October 22, 2005 || Kitt Peak || Spacewatch || — || align=right | 1.4 km || 
|-id=485 bgcolor=#fefefe
| 272485 ||  || — || October 24, 2005 || Kitt Peak || Spacewatch || MAS || align=right data-sort-value="0.79" | 790 m || 
|-id=486 bgcolor=#fefefe
| 272486 ||  || — || October 24, 2005 || Kitt Peak || Spacewatch || NYS || align=right data-sort-value="0.73" | 730 m || 
|-id=487 bgcolor=#E9E9E9
| 272487 ||  || — || October 24, 2005 || Kitt Peak || Spacewatch || — || align=right | 2.1 km || 
|-id=488 bgcolor=#E9E9E9
| 272488 ||  || — || October 24, 2005 || Kitt Peak || Spacewatch || — || align=right | 1.8 km || 
|-id=489 bgcolor=#E9E9E9
| 272489 ||  || — || October 24, 2005 || Kitt Peak || Spacewatch || — || align=right data-sort-value="0.94" | 940 m || 
|-id=490 bgcolor=#E9E9E9
| 272490 ||  || — || October 24, 2005 || Palomar || NEAT || — || align=right | 2.0 km || 
|-id=491 bgcolor=#fefefe
| 272491 ||  || — || October 25, 2005 || Mount Lemmon || Mount Lemmon Survey || MAS || align=right data-sort-value="0.72" | 720 m || 
|-id=492 bgcolor=#E9E9E9
| 272492 ||  || — || October 25, 2005 || Mount Lemmon || Mount Lemmon Survey || — || align=right | 1.2 km || 
|-id=493 bgcolor=#E9E9E9
| 272493 ||  || — || October 26, 2005 || Kitt Peak || Spacewatch || — || align=right | 1.5 km || 
|-id=494 bgcolor=#E9E9E9
| 272494 ||  || — || October 26, 2005 || Kitt Peak || Spacewatch || — || align=right data-sort-value="0.82" | 820 m || 
|-id=495 bgcolor=#d6d6d6
| 272495 ||  || — || October 26, 2005 || Kitt Peak || Spacewatch || — || align=right | 2.6 km || 
|-id=496 bgcolor=#E9E9E9
| 272496 ||  || — || October 26, 2005 || Kitt Peak || Spacewatch || — || align=right | 2.5 km || 
|-id=497 bgcolor=#E9E9E9
| 272497 ||  || — || December 5, 2001 || Haleakala || NEAT || RAF || align=right | 1.2 km || 
|-id=498 bgcolor=#E9E9E9
| 272498 ||  || — || October 26, 2005 || Palomar || NEAT || ADE || align=right | 1.9 km || 
|-id=499 bgcolor=#FA8072
| 272499 ||  || — || October 30, 2005 || Socorro || LINEAR || — || align=right | 1.4 km || 
|-id=500 bgcolor=#fefefe
| 272500 ||  || — || October 25, 2005 || Catalina || CSS || FLO || align=right | 1.0 km || 
|}

272501–272600 

|-bgcolor=#E9E9E9
| 272501 ||  || — || October 21, 2005 || Palomar || NEAT || — || align=right | 1.4 km || 
|-id=502 bgcolor=#E9E9E9
| 272502 ||  || — || October 22, 2005 || Catalina || CSS || — || align=right | 1.8 km || 
|-id=503 bgcolor=#E9E9E9
| 272503 ||  || — || October 24, 2005 || Kitt Peak || Spacewatch || — || align=right | 1.1 km || 
|-id=504 bgcolor=#fefefe
| 272504 ||  || — || October 24, 2005 || Kitt Peak || Spacewatch || NYS || align=right data-sort-value="0.88" | 880 m || 
|-id=505 bgcolor=#d6d6d6
| 272505 ||  || — || October 24, 2005 || Kitt Peak || Spacewatch || — || align=right | 3.9 km || 
|-id=506 bgcolor=#E9E9E9
| 272506 ||  || — || October 24, 2005 || Kitt Peak || Spacewatch || — || align=right | 1.5 km || 
|-id=507 bgcolor=#fefefe
| 272507 ||  || — || October 24, 2005 || Kitt Peak || Spacewatch || — || align=right data-sort-value="0.98" | 980 m || 
|-id=508 bgcolor=#fefefe
| 272508 ||  || — || October 25, 2005 || Mount Lemmon || Mount Lemmon Survey || V || align=right data-sort-value="0.83" | 830 m || 
|-id=509 bgcolor=#E9E9E9
| 272509 ||  || — || October 25, 2005 || Mount Lemmon || Mount Lemmon Survey || — || align=right | 2.0 km || 
|-id=510 bgcolor=#E9E9E9
| 272510 ||  || — || October 24, 2005 || Kitt Peak || Spacewatch || — || align=right | 1.2 km || 
|-id=511 bgcolor=#fefefe
| 272511 ||  || — || October 25, 2005 || Kitt Peak || Spacewatch || — || align=right data-sort-value="0.89" | 890 m || 
|-id=512 bgcolor=#E9E9E9
| 272512 ||  || — || October 25, 2005 || Kitt Peak || Spacewatch || — || align=right | 1.4 km || 
|-id=513 bgcolor=#E9E9E9
| 272513 ||  || — || October 27, 2005 || Mount Lemmon || Mount Lemmon Survey || — || align=right | 1.9 km || 
|-id=514 bgcolor=#E9E9E9
| 272514 ||  || — || October 25, 2005 || Kitt Peak || Spacewatch || — || align=right | 1.2 km || 
|-id=515 bgcolor=#E9E9E9
| 272515 ||  || — || October 25, 2005 || Kitt Peak || Spacewatch || — || align=right | 1.8 km || 
|-id=516 bgcolor=#fefefe
| 272516 ||  || — || October 25, 2005 || Kitt Peak || Spacewatch || — || align=right | 1.1 km || 
|-id=517 bgcolor=#E9E9E9
| 272517 ||  || — || October 28, 2005 || Mount Lemmon || Mount Lemmon Survey || — || align=right data-sort-value="0.99" | 990 m || 
|-id=518 bgcolor=#E9E9E9
| 272518 ||  || — || October 25, 2005 || Anderson Mesa || LONEOS || IAN || align=right data-sort-value="0.93" | 930 m || 
|-id=519 bgcolor=#E9E9E9
| 272519 ||  || — || October 24, 2005 || Kitt Peak || Spacewatch || — || align=right data-sort-value="0.99" | 990 m || 
|-id=520 bgcolor=#fefefe
| 272520 ||  || — || October 26, 2005 || Kitt Peak || Spacewatch || — || align=right | 1.0 km || 
|-id=521 bgcolor=#fefefe
| 272521 ||  || — || October 26, 2005 || Kitt Peak || Spacewatch || MAS || align=right data-sort-value="0.97" | 970 m || 
|-id=522 bgcolor=#d6d6d6
| 272522 ||  || — || October 27, 2005 || Kitt Peak || Spacewatch || — || align=right | 2.6 km || 
|-id=523 bgcolor=#fefefe
| 272523 ||  || — || October 27, 2005 || Kitt Peak || Spacewatch || MAS || align=right data-sort-value="0.73" | 730 m || 
|-id=524 bgcolor=#E9E9E9
| 272524 ||  || — || October 27, 2005 || Kitt Peak || Spacewatch || — || align=right data-sort-value="0.79" | 790 m || 
|-id=525 bgcolor=#E9E9E9
| 272525 ||  || — || October 28, 2005 || Mount Lemmon || Mount Lemmon Survey || — || align=right | 1.4 km || 
|-id=526 bgcolor=#fefefe
| 272526 ||  || — || October 29, 2005 || Mount Lemmon || Mount Lemmon Survey || V || align=right data-sort-value="0.81" | 810 m || 
|-id=527 bgcolor=#E9E9E9
| 272527 ||  || — || October 24, 2005 || Palomar || NEAT || — || align=right | 2.0 km || 
|-id=528 bgcolor=#E9E9E9
| 272528 ||  || — || October 24, 2005 || Kitt Peak || Spacewatch || — || align=right data-sort-value="0.94" | 940 m || 
|-id=529 bgcolor=#fefefe
| 272529 ||  || — || October 25, 2005 || Mount Lemmon || Mount Lemmon Survey || MASfast? || align=right data-sort-value="0.85" | 850 m || 
|-id=530 bgcolor=#E9E9E9
| 272530 ||  || — || October 26, 2005 || Kitt Peak || Spacewatch || — || align=right data-sort-value="0.98" | 980 m || 
|-id=531 bgcolor=#fefefe
| 272531 ||  || — || October 26, 2005 || Kitt Peak || Spacewatch || — || align=right | 1.0 km || 
|-id=532 bgcolor=#E9E9E9
| 272532 ||  || — || October 26, 2005 || Kitt Peak || Spacewatch || — || align=right | 1.3 km || 
|-id=533 bgcolor=#E9E9E9
| 272533 ||  || — || October 26, 2005 || Kitt Peak || Spacewatch || — || align=right | 1.1 km || 
|-id=534 bgcolor=#fefefe
| 272534 ||  || — || October 26, 2005 || Kitt Peak || Spacewatch || — || align=right data-sort-value="0.99" | 990 m || 
|-id=535 bgcolor=#E9E9E9
| 272535 ||  || — || October 27, 2005 || Mount Lemmon || Mount Lemmon Survey || — || align=right | 1.8 km || 
|-id=536 bgcolor=#E9E9E9
| 272536 ||  || — || October 28, 2005 || Mount Lemmon || Mount Lemmon Survey || HEN || align=right | 1.0 km || 
|-id=537 bgcolor=#E9E9E9
| 272537 ||  || — || October 28, 2005 || Catalina || CSS || EUN || align=right | 1.3 km || 
|-id=538 bgcolor=#E9E9E9
| 272538 ||  || — || October 27, 2005 || Kitt Peak || Spacewatch || HEN || align=right | 1.1 km || 
|-id=539 bgcolor=#fefefe
| 272539 ||  || — || October 28, 2005 || Kitt Peak || Spacewatch || MAS || align=right data-sort-value="0.71" | 710 m || 
|-id=540 bgcolor=#fefefe
| 272540 ||  || — || October 28, 2005 || Mount Lemmon || Mount Lemmon Survey || — || align=right data-sort-value="0.85" | 850 m || 
|-id=541 bgcolor=#fefefe
| 272541 ||  || — || October 28, 2005 || Mount Lemmon || Mount Lemmon Survey || MAS || align=right data-sort-value="0.97" | 970 m || 
|-id=542 bgcolor=#fefefe
| 272542 ||  || — || October 28, 2005 || Mount Lemmon || Mount Lemmon Survey || — || align=right data-sort-value="0.91" | 910 m || 
|-id=543 bgcolor=#d6d6d6
| 272543 ||  || — || October 29, 2005 || Kitt Peak || Spacewatch || EOS || align=right | 2.2 km || 
|-id=544 bgcolor=#d6d6d6
| 272544 ||  || — || October 26, 2005 || Anderson Mesa || LONEOS || TEL || align=right | 2.1 km || 
|-id=545 bgcolor=#E9E9E9
| 272545 ||  || — || October 27, 2005 || Kitt Peak || Spacewatch || — || align=right | 1.2 km || 
|-id=546 bgcolor=#E9E9E9
| 272546 ||  || — || October 27, 2005 || Kitt Peak || Spacewatch || — || align=right | 1.1 km || 
|-id=547 bgcolor=#fefefe
| 272547 ||  || — || October 27, 2005 || Socorro || LINEAR || — || align=right data-sort-value="0.98" | 980 m || 
|-id=548 bgcolor=#fefefe
| 272548 ||  || — || October 26, 2005 || Mount Lemmon || Mount Lemmon Survey || FLO || align=right data-sort-value="0.75" | 750 m || 
|-id=549 bgcolor=#fefefe
| 272549 ||  || — || October 27, 2005 || Socorro || LINEAR || V || align=right data-sort-value="0.94" | 940 m || 
|-id=550 bgcolor=#d6d6d6
| 272550 ||  || — || October 28, 2005 || Socorro || LINEAR || — || align=right | 3.1 km || 
|-id=551 bgcolor=#fefefe
| 272551 ||  || — || October 31, 2005 || Socorro || LINEAR || MAS || align=right data-sort-value="0.98" | 980 m || 
|-id=552 bgcolor=#fefefe
| 272552 ||  || — || October 25, 2005 || Kitt Peak || Spacewatch || NYS || align=right data-sort-value="0.79" | 790 m || 
|-id=553 bgcolor=#E9E9E9
| 272553 ||  || — || October 28, 2005 || Kitt Peak || Spacewatch || HEN || align=right | 1.2 km || 
|-id=554 bgcolor=#E9E9E9
| 272554 ||  || — || October 29, 2005 || Palomar || NEAT || — || align=right | 1.2 km || 
|-id=555 bgcolor=#E9E9E9
| 272555 ||  || — || October 29, 2005 || Socorro || LINEAR || — || align=right | 2.5 km || 
|-id=556 bgcolor=#fefefe
| 272556 ||  || — || October 30, 2005 || Socorro || LINEAR || — || align=right | 1.2 km || 
|-id=557 bgcolor=#E9E9E9
| 272557 ||  || — || October 29, 2005 || Catalina || CSS || — || align=right | 1.9 km || 
|-id=558 bgcolor=#fefefe
| 272558 ||  || — || October 30, 2005 || Kitt Peak || Spacewatch || NYS || align=right data-sort-value="0.74" | 740 m || 
|-id=559 bgcolor=#fefefe
| 272559 ||  || — || October 30, 2005 || Kitt Peak || Spacewatch || NYS || align=right data-sort-value="0.71" | 710 m || 
|-id=560 bgcolor=#FA8072
| 272560 ||  || — || October 30, 2005 || Kitt Peak || Spacewatch || — || align=right | 1.1 km || 
|-id=561 bgcolor=#E9E9E9
| 272561 ||  || — || October 28, 2005 || Kitt Peak || Spacewatch || — || align=right | 2.7 km || 
|-id=562 bgcolor=#fefefe
| 272562 ||  || — || October 28, 2005 || Mount Lemmon || Mount Lemmon Survey || ERI || align=right | 3.0 km || 
|-id=563 bgcolor=#E9E9E9
| 272563 ||  || — || October 25, 2005 || Catalina || CSS || — || align=right | 1.4 km || 
|-id=564 bgcolor=#fefefe
| 272564 ||  || — || October 22, 2005 || Catalina || CSS || FLO || align=right data-sort-value="0.89" | 890 m || 
|-id=565 bgcolor=#E9E9E9
| 272565 ||  || — || October 24, 2005 || Palomar || NEAT || — || align=right | 1.5 km || 
|-id=566 bgcolor=#d6d6d6
| 272566 ||  || — || January 15, 1996 || Kitt Peak || Spacewatch || — || align=right | 4.0 km || 
|-id=567 bgcolor=#fefefe
| 272567 ||  || — || October 26, 2005 || Socorro || LINEAR || — || align=right | 1.3 km || 
|-id=568 bgcolor=#E9E9E9
| 272568 ||  || — || October 27, 2005 || Socorro || LINEAR || EUN || align=right | 1.5 km || 
|-id=569 bgcolor=#E9E9E9
| 272569 ||  || — || October 27, 2005 || Mount Lemmon || Mount Lemmon Survey || — || align=right | 1.8 km || 
|-id=570 bgcolor=#fefefe
| 272570 ||  || — || October 20, 2005 || Apache Point || A. C. Becker || — || align=right data-sort-value="0.90" | 900 m || 
|-id=571 bgcolor=#d6d6d6
| 272571 ||  || — || October 20, 2005 || Apache Point || A. C. Becker || CHA || align=right | 2.7 km || 
|-id=572 bgcolor=#fefefe
| 272572 ||  || — || October 25, 2005 || Apache Point || A. C. Becker || NYS || align=right data-sort-value="0.72" | 720 m || 
|-id=573 bgcolor=#E9E9E9
| 272573 ||  || — || October 27, 2005 || Apache Point || A. C. Becker || — || align=right data-sort-value="0.94" | 940 m || 
|-id=574 bgcolor=#fefefe
| 272574 ||  || — || November 10, 2005 || Kitt Peak || Spacewatch || MAS || align=right data-sort-value="0.86" | 860 m || 
|-id=575 bgcolor=#E9E9E9
| 272575 ||  || — || November 6, 2005 || Kitt Peak || Spacewatch || — || align=right | 2.5 km || 
|-id=576 bgcolor=#E9E9E9
| 272576 ||  || — || November 2, 2005 || Mount Lemmon || Mount Lemmon Survey || — || align=right | 1.9 km || 
|-id=577 bgcolor=#E9E9E9
| 272577 ||  || — || November 4, 2005 || Kitt Peak || Spacewatch || WIT || align=right | 1.4 km || 
|-id=578 bgcolor=#d6d6d6
| 272578 ||  || — || November 4, 2005 || Kitt Peak || Spacewatch || — || align=right | 3.8 km || 
|-id=579 bgcolor=#E9E9E9
| 272579 ||  || — || November 1, 2005 || Kitt Peak || Spacewatch || — || align=right data-sort-value="0.99" | 990 m || 
|-id=580 bgcolor=#E9E9E9
| 272580 ||  || — || November 3, 2005 || Mount Lemmon || Mount Lemmon Survey || — || align=right | 1.4 km || 
|-id=581 bgcolor=#fefefe
| 272581 ||  || — || November 4, 2005 || Kitt Peak || Spacewatch || — || align=right | 1.3 km || 
|-id=582 bgcolor=#E9E9E9
| 272582 ||  || — || November 3, 2005 || Mount Lemmon || Mount Lemmon Survey || — || align=right | 1.5 km || 
|-id=583 bgcolor=#E9E9E9
| 272583 ||  || — || November 3, 2005 || Socorro || LINEAR || — || align=right | 2.8 km || 
|-id=584 bgcolor=#E9E9E9
| 272584 ||  || — || November 3, 2005 || Catalina || CSS || — || align=right | 1.9 km || 
|-id=585 bgcolor=#d6d6d6
| 272585 ||  || — || November 4, 2005 || Mount Lemmon || Mount Lemmon Survey || — || align=right | 3.9 km || 
|-id=586 bgcolor=#fefefe
| 272586 ||  || — || November 1, 2005 || Kitt Peak || Spacewatch || — || align=right | 1.2 km || 
|-id=587 bgcolor=#fefefe
| 272587 ||  || — || November 3, 2005 || Catalina || CSS || — || align=right | 1.0 km || 
|-id=588 bgcolor=#E9E9E9
| 272588 ||  || — || November 4, 2005 || Catalina || CSS || — || align=right | 1.1 km || 
|-id=589 bgcolor=#fefefe
| 272589 ||  || — || November 4, 2005 || Mount Lemmon || Mount Lemmon Survey || FLO || align=right data-sort-value="0.86" | 860 m || 
|-id=590 bgcolor=#d6d6d6
| 272590 ||  || — || November 1, 2005 || Mount Lemmon || Mount Lemmon Survey || TIR || align=right | 4.4 km || 
|-id=591 bgcolor=#fefefe
| 272591 ||  || — || November 5, 2005 || Catalina || CSS || — || align=right | 1.0 km || 
|-id=592 bgcolor=#d6d6d6
| 272592 ||  || — || November 5, 2005 || Kitt Peak || Spacewatch || — || align=right | 4.6 km || 
|-id=593 bgcolor=#E9E9E9
| 272593 ||  || — || November 6, 2005 || Kitt Peak || Spacewatch || KON || align=right | 2.2 km || 
|-id=594 bgcolor=#d6d6d6
| 272594 ||  || — || November 6, 2005 || Kitt Peak || Spacewatch || — || align=right | 4.7 km || 
|-id=595 bgcolor=#E9E9E9
| 272595 ||  || — || November 6, 2005 || Mount Lemmon || Mount Lemmon Survey || — || align=right | 1.5 km || 
|-id=596 bgcolor=#d6d6d6
| 272596 ||  || — || November 5, 2005 || Kitt Peak || Spacewatch || EOS || align=right | 2.8 km || 
|-id=597 bgcolor=#E9E9E9
| 272597 ||  || — || November 6, 2005 || Mount Lemmon || Mount Lemmon Survey || — || align=right | 1.4 km || 
|-id=598 bgcolor=#fefefe
| 272598 ||  || — || November 6, 2005 || Mount Lemmon || Mount Lemmon Survey || MAS || align=right | 1.1 km || 
|-id=599 bgcolor=#E9E9E9
| 272599 ||  || — || November 10, 2005 || Mount Lemmon || Mount Lemmon Survey || HEN || align=right data-sort-value="0.96" | 960 m || 
|-id=600 bgcolor=#fefefe
| 272600 ||  || — || November 1, 2005 || Apache Point || A. C. Becker || — || align=right data-sort-value="0.69" | 690 m || 
|}

272601–272700 

|-bgcolor=#E9E9E9
| 272601 ||  || — || November 3, 2005 || Kitt Peak || Spacewatch || — || align=right data-sort-value="0.93" | 930 m || 
|-id=602 bgcolor=#E9E9E9
| 272602 ||  || — || November 20, 2005 || Palomar || NEAT || — || align=right | 1.9 km || 
|-id=603 bgcolor=#fefefe
| 272603 ||  || — || November 21, 2005 || Kitt Peak || Spacewatch || SUL || align=right | 2.8 km || 
|-id=604 bgcolor=#E9E9E9
| 272604 ||  || — || November 21, 2005 || Kitt Peak || Spacewatch || — || align=right | 1.1 km || 
|-id=605 bgcolor=#E9E9E9
| 272605 ||  || — || November 21, 2005 || Kitt Peak || Spacewatch || — || align=right | 1.5 km || 
|-id=606 bgcolor=#E9E9E9
| 272606 ||  || — || November 22, 2005 || Kitt Peak || Spacewatch || — || align=right | 1.9 km || 
|-id=607 bgcolor=#E9E9E9
| 272607 ||  || — || November 22, 2005 || Kitt Peak || Spacewatch || — || align=right | 1.2 km || 
|-id=608 bgcolor=#E9E9E9
| 272608 ||  || — || November 22, 2005 || Kitt Peak || Spacewatch || — || align=right | 1.1 km || 
|-id=609 bgcolor=#d6d6d6
| 272609 ||  || — || November 22, 2005 || Kitt Peak || Spacewatch || HYG || align=right | 3.4 km || 
|-id=610 bgcolor=#E9E9E9
| 272610 ||  || — || November 22, 2005 || Kitt Peak || Spacewatch || — || align=right | 1.2 km || 
|-id=611 bgcolor=#E9E9E9
| 272611 ||  || — || November 22, 2005 || Kitt Peak || Spacewatch || — || align=right | 2.3 km || 
|-id=612 bgcolor=#E9E9E9
| 272612 ||  || — || November 22, 2005 || Kitt Peak || Spacewatch || — || align=right | 2.0 km || 
|-id=613 bgcolor=#E9E9E9
| 272613 ||  || — || November 21, 2005 || Kitt Peak || Spacewatch || — || align=right | 1.4 km || 
|-id=614 bgcolor=#E9E9E9
| 272614 ||  || — || November 21, 2005 || Anderson Mesa || LONEOS || ADE || align=right | 2.2 km || 
|-id=615 bgcolor=#E9E9E9
| 272615 ||  || — || November 21, 2005 || Kitt Peak || Spacewatch || — || align=right data-sort-value="0.93" | 930 m || 
|-id=616 bgcolor=#E9E9E9
| 272616 ||  || — || November 21, 2005 || Kitt Peak || Spacewatch || — || align=right | 1.2 km || 
|-id=617 bgcolor=#E9E9E9
| 272617 ||  || — || November 21, 2005 || Kitt Peak || Spacewatch || — || align=right | 2.3 km || 
|-id=618 bgcolor=#E9E9E9
| 272618 ||  || — || November 21, 2005 || Kitt Peak || Spacewatch || WIT || align=right data-sort-value="0.82" | 820 m || 
|-id=619 bgcolor=#E9E9E9
| 272619 ||  || — || November 21, 2005 || Kitt Peak || Spacewatch || — || align=right | 2.5 km || 
|-id=620 bgcolor=#E9E9E9
| 272620 ||  || — || November 22, 2005 || Kitt Peak || Spacewatch || — || align=right data-sort-value="0.98" | 980 m || 
|-id=621 bgcolor=#fefefe
| 272621 ||  || — || November 22, 2005 || Kitt Peak || Spacewatch || MAS || align=right data-sort-value="0.78" | 780 m || 
|-id=622 bgcolor=#E9E9E9
| 272622 ||  || — || November 22, 2005 || Kitt Peak || Spacewatch || AER || align=right | 1.7 km || 
|-id=623 bgcolor=#E9E9E9
| 272623 ||  || — || November 25, 2005 || Mount Lemmon || Mount Lemmon Survey || — || align=right | 1.6 km || 
|-id=624 bgcolor=#fefefe
| 272624 ||  || — || November 25, 2005 || Kitt Peak || Spacewatch || NYS || align=right data-sort-value="0.82" | 820 m || 
|-id=625 bgcolor=#E9E9E9
| 272625 ||  || — || November 25, 2005 || Mount Lemmon || Mount Lemmon Survey || — || align=right | 3.1 km || 
|-id=626 bgcolor=#fefefe
| 272626 ||  || — || November 25, 2005 || Kitt Peak || Spacewatch || NYS || align=right data-sort-value="0.78" | 780 m || 
|-id=627 bgcolor=#fefefe
| 272627 ||  || — || November 25, 2005 || Catalina || CSS || V || align=right data-sort-value="0.91" | 910 m || 
|-id=628 bgcolor=#E9E9E9
| 272628 ||  || — || November 21, 2005 || Kitt Peak || Spacewatch || — || align=right | 1.1 km || 
|-id=629 bgcolor=#E9E9E9
| 272629 ||  || — || November 22, 2005 || Kitt Peak || Spacewatch || — || align=right | 2.3 km || 
|-id=630 bgcolor=#E9E9E9
| 272630 ||  || — || November 22, 2005 || Kitt Peak || Spacewatch || — || align=right | 2.0 km || 
|-id=631 bgcolor=#fefefe
| 272631 ||  || — || November 25, 2005 || Mount Lemmon || Mount Lemmon Survey || NYS || align=right data-sort-value="0.76" | 760 m || 
|-id=632 bgcolor=#d6d6d6
| 272632 ||  || — || November 21, 2005 || Kitt Peak || Spacewatch || — || align=right | 3.9 km || 
|-id=633 bgcolor=#E9E9E9
| 272633 ||  || — || November 25, 2005 || Catalina || CSS || MIS || align=right | 3.1 km || 
|-id=634 bgcolor=#E9E9E9
| 272634 ||  || — || November 28, 2005 || Palomar || NEAT || EUN || align=right | 1.5 km || 
|-id=635 bgcolor=#E9E9E9
| 272635 ||  || — || November 25, 2005 || Kitt Peak || Spacewatch || — || align=right | 2.3 km || 
|-id=636 bgcolor=#E9E9E9
| 272636 ||  || — || November 25, 2005 || Kitt Peak || Spacewatch || — || align=right | 1.3 km || 
|-id=637 bgcolor=#fefefe
| 272637 ||  || — || November 25, 2005 || Kitt Peak || Spacewatch || — || align=right | 1.4 km || 
|-id=638 bgcolor=#fefefe
| 272638 ||  || — || November 25, 2005 || Kitt Peak || Spacewatch || — || align=right | 1.1 km || 
|-id=639 bgcolor=#E9E9E9
| 272639 ||  || — || November 26, 2005 || Mount Lemmon || Mount Lemmon Survey || — || align=right | 1.8 km || 
|-id=640 bgcolor=#fefefe
| 272640 ||  || — || November 26, 2005 || Mount Lemmon || Mount Lemmon Survey || — || align=right | 1.0 km || 
|-id=641 bgcolor=#E9E9E9
| 272641 ||  || — || November 28, 2005 || Catalina || CSS || — || align=right | 1.3 km || 
|-id=642 bgcolor=#E9E9E9
| 272642 ||  || — || November 28, 2005 || Mount Lemmon || Mount Lemmon Survey || — || align=right | 3.5 km || 
|-id=643 bgcolor=#E9E9E9
| 272643 ||  || — || November 28, 2005 || Catalina || CSS || — || align=right | 1.1 km || 
|-id=644 bgcolor=#fefefe
| 272644 ||  || — || November 29, 2005 || Mount Lemmon || Mount Lemmon Survey || FLO || align=right data-sort-value="0.99" | 990 m || 
|-id=645 bgcolor=#d6d6d6
| 272645 ||  || — || November 29, 2005 || Mount Lemmon || Mount Lemmon Survey || — || align=right | 2.7 km || 
|-id=646 bgcolor=#E9E9E9
| 272646 ||  || — || November 30, 2005 || Eskridge || Farpoint Obs. || — || align=right data-sort-value="0.89" | 890 m || 
|-id=647 bgcolor=#E9E9E9
| 272647 ||  || — || November 30, 2005 || Socorro || LINEAR || — || align=right | 1.7 km || 
|-id=648 bgcolor=#E9E9E9
| 272648 ||  || — || November 25, 2005 || Kitt Peak || Spacewatch || — || align=right | 1.4 km || 
|-id=649 bgcolor=#E9E9E9
| 272649 ||  || — || November 25, 2005 || Mount Lemmon || Mount Lemmon Survey || — || align=right | 1.2 km || 
|-id=650 bgcolor=#E9E9E9
| 272650 ||  || — || November 25, 2005 || Kitt Peak || Spacewatch || MIS || align=right | 1.9 km || 
|-id=651 bgcolor=#E9E9E9
| 272651 ||  || — || November 25, 2005 || Kitt Peak || Spacewatch || AEO || align=right | 1.7 km || 
|-id=652 bgcolor=#E9E9E9
| 272652 ||  || — || November 30, 2005 || Socorro || LINEAR || — || align=right | 2.0 km || 
|-id=653 bgcolor=#E9E9E9
| 272653 ||  || — || November 28, 2005 || Mount Lemmon || Mount Lemmon Survey || EUN || align=right | 2.1 km || 
|-id=654 bgcolor=#fefefe
| 272654 ||  || — || November 30, 2005 || Kitt Peak || Spacewatch || NYS || align=right data-sort-value="0.97" | 970 m || 
|-id=655 bgcolor=#fefefe
| 272655 ||  || — || November 30, 2005 || Kitt Peak || Spacewatch || MAS || align=right data-sort-value="0.93" | 930 m || 
|-id=656 bgcolor=#E9E9E9
| 272656 ||  || — || November 30, 2005 || Kitt Peak || Spacewatch || — || align=right | 2.5 km || 
|-id=657 bgcolor=#E9E9E9
| 272657 ||  || — || November 30, 2005 || Kitt Peak || Spacewatch || — || align=right | 2.8 km || 
|-id=658 bgcolor=#E9E9E9
| 272658 ||  || — || November 30, 2005 || Kitt Peak || Spacewatch || MIS || align=right | 2.5 km || 
|-id=659 bgcolor=#E9E9E9
| 272659 ||  || — || November 25, 2005 || Catalina || CSS || RAF || align=right | 1.2 km || 
|-id=660 bgcolor=#E9E9E9
| 272660 ||  || — || November 25, 2005 || Catalina || CSS || — || align=right | 3.5 km || 
|-id=661 bgcolor=#E9E9E9
| 272661 ||  || — || November 27, 2005 || Anderson Mesa || LONEOS || EUN || align=right | 1.7 km || 
|-id=662 bgcolor=#E9E9E9
| 272662 ||  || — || November 29, 2005 || Anderson Mesa || LONEOS || — || align=right | 2.0 km || 
|-id=663 bgcolor=#E9E9E9
| 272663 ||  || — || November 30, 2005 || Socorro || LINEAR || — || align=right | 3.4 km || 
|-id=664 bgcolor=#E9E9E9
| 272664 ||  || — || November 29, 2005 || Mount Lemmon || Mount Lemmon Survey || — || align=right | 2.1 km || 
|-id=665 bgcolor=#E9E9E9
| 272665 ||  || — || November 29, 2005 || Kitt Peak || Spacewatch || HOF || align=right | 3.3 km || 
|-id=666 bgcolor=#fefefe
| 272666 ||  || — || November 25, 2005 || Catalina || CSS || — || align=right | 1.3 km || 
|-id=667 bgcolor=#E9E9E9
| 272667 ||  || — || November 30, 2005 || Palomar || NEAT || — || align=right | 1.4 km || 
|-id=668 bgcolor=#E9E9E9
| 272668 ||  || — || November 29, 2005 || Kitt Peak || Spacewatch || — || align=right | 1.9 km || 
|-id=669 bgcolor=#E9E9E9
| 272669 ||  || — || November 25, 2005 || Mount Lemmon || Mount Lemmon Survey || — || align=right | 3.1 km || 
|-id=670 bgcolor=#E9E9E9
| 272670 || 2005 XD || — || December 1, 2005 || Mayhill || iTelescope Obs. || — || align=right | 3.0 km || 
|-id=671 bgcolor=#E9E9E9
| 272671 || 2005 XQ || — || December 1, 2005 || Kitami || K. Endate || — || align=right | 2.3 km || 
|-id=672 bgcolor=#E9E9E9
| 272672 ||  || — || December 4, 2005 || Junk Bond || D. Healy || — || align=right | 2.9 km || 
|-id=673 bgcolor=#fefefe
| 272673 ||  || — || December 1, 2005 || Palomar || NEAT || — || align=right | 1.3 km || 
|-id=674 bgcolor=#d6d6d6
| 272674 ||  || — || December 1, 2005 || Socorro || LINEAR || — || align=right | 3.8 km || 
|-id=675 bgcolor=#E9E9E9
| 272675 ||  || — || December 1, 2005 || Mount Lemmon || Mount Lemmon Survey || ADE || align=right | 2.7 km || 
|-id=676 bgcolor=#fefefe
| 272676 ||  || — || December 1, 2005 || Kitt Peak || Spacewatch || — || align=right | 1.2 km || 
|-id=677 bgcolor=#E9E9E9
| 272677 ||  || — || December 1, 2005 || Kitt Peak || Spacewatch || — || align=right | 1.6 km || 
|-id=678 bgcolor=#E9E9E9
| 272678 ||  || — || December 2, 2005 || Mount Lemmon || Mount Lemmon Survey || — || align=right | 1.1 km || 
|-id=679 bgcolor=#E9E9E9
| 272679 ||  || — || December 2, 2005 || Mount Lemmon || Mount Lemmon Survey || — || align=right | 1.4 km || 
|-id=680 bgcolor=#fefefe
| 272680 ||  || — || December 4, 2005 || Mount Lemmon || Mount Lemmon Survey || MAS || align=right data-sort-value="0.95" | 950 m || 
|-id=681 bgcolor=#E9E9E9
| 272681 ||  || — || December 4, 2005 || Kitt Peak || Spacewatch || — || align=right | 2.2 km || 
|-id=682 bgcolor=#d6d6d6
| 272682 ||  || — || December 4, 2005 || Kitt Peak || Spacewatch || — || align=right | 4.1 km || 
|-id=683 bgcolor=#E9E9E9
| 272683 ||  || — || December 2, 2005 || Mount Lemmon || Mount Lemmon Survey || — || align=right | 1.3 km || 
|-id=684 bgcolor=#E9E9E9
| 272684 ||  || — || December 1, 2005 || Catalina || CSS || HNS || align=right | 1.4 km || 
|-id=685 bgcolor=#d6d6d6
| 272685 ||  || — || December 4, 2005 || Goodricke-Pigott || Goodricke-Pigott Obs. || EUP || align=right | 6.8 km || 
|-id=686 bgcolor=#E9E9E9
| 272686 ||  || — || December 5, 2005 || Kitt Peak || Spacewatch || — || align=right data-sort-value="0.94" | 940 m || 
|-id=687 bgcolor=#E9E9E9
| 272687 ||  || — || December 7, 2005 || Catalina || CSS || — || align=right | 1.8 km || 
|-id=688 bgcolor=#E9E9E9
| 272688 ||  || — || December 7, 2005 || Kitt Peak || Spacewatch || — || align=right | 1.6 km || 
|-id=689 bgcolor=#d6d6d6
| 272689 ||  || — || December 3, 2005 || Kitt Peak || Spacewatch || — || align=right | 3.9 km || 
|-id=690 bgcolor=#E9E9E9
| 272690 ||  || — || December 5, 2005 || Mount Lemmon || Mount Lemmon Survey || — || align=right | 1.7 km || 
|-id=691 bgcolor=#fefefe
| 272691 ||  || — || December 6, 2005 || Kitt Peak || Spacewatch || MAS || align=right data-sort-value="0.94" | 940 m || 
|-id=692 bgcolor=#E9E9E9
| 272692 ||  || — || December 6, 2005 || Kitt Peak || Spacewatch || — || align=right | 1.6 km || 
|-id=693 bgcolor=#E9E9E9
| 272693 ||  || — || December 8, 2005 || Kitt Peak || Spacewatch || MIS || align=right | 1.7 km || 
|-id=694 bgcolor=#E9E9E9
| 272694 ||  || — || December 7, 2005 || Kitt Peak || Spacewatch || — || align=right | 1.6 km || 
|-id=695 bgcolor=#E9E9E9
| 272695 ||  || — || December 8, 2005 || Kitt Peak || Spacewatch || — || align=right | 2.7 km || 
|-id=696 bgcolor=#fefefe
| 272696 ||  || — || December 1, 2005 || Kitt Peak || M. W. Buie || V || align=right data-sort-value="0.83" | 830 m || 
|-id=697 bgcolor=#E9E9E9
| 272697 ||  || — || December 1, 2005 || Kitt Peak || M. W. Buie || HEN || align=right data-sort-value="0.96" | 960 m || 
|-id=698 bgcolor=#E9E9E9
| 272698 ||  || — || December 1, 2005 || Kitt Peak || M. W. Buie || — || align=right data-sort-value="0.96" | 960 m || 
|-id=699 bgcolor=#E9E9E9
| 272699 ||  || — || December 21, 2005 || Catalina || CSS || — || align=right | 1.5 km || 
|-id=700 bgcolor=#E9E9E9
| 272700 ||  || — || December 21, 2005 || Kitt Peak || Spacewatch || — || align=right | 2.3 km || 
|}

272701–272800 

|-bgcolor=#E9E9E9
| 272701 ||  || — || December 21, 2005 || Kitt Peak || Spacewatch || — || align=right | 1.8 km || 
|-id=702 bgcolor=#E9E9E9
| 272702 ||  || — || December 22, 2005 || Kitt Peak || Spacewatch || — || align=right | 1.3 km || 
|-id=703 bgcolor=#E9E9E9
| 272703 ||  || — || December 22, 2005 || Kitt Peak || Spacewatch || — || align=right | 1.5 km || 
|-id=704 bgcolor=#d6d6d6
| 272704 ||  || — || December 22, 2005 || Kitt Peak || Spacewatch || KOR || align=right | 1.7 km || 
|-id=705 bgcolor=#d6d6d6
| 272705 ||  || — || December 24, 2005 || Kitt Peak || Spacewatch || KOR || align=right | 1.6 km || 
|-id=706 bgcolor=#E9E9E9
| 272706 ||  || — || December 24, 2005 || Kitt Peak || Spacewatch || — || align=right | 1.9 km || 
|-id=707 bgcolor=#E9E9E9
| 272707 ||  || — || December 24, 2005 || Kitt Peak || Spacewatch || GEF || align=right | 1.5 km || 
|-id=708 bgcolor=#E9E9E9
| 272708 ||  || — || December 21, 2005 || Kitt Peak || Spacewatch || — || align=right | 2.2 km || 
|-id=709 bgcolor=#E9E9E9
| 272709 ||  || — || December 22, 2005 || Kitt Peak || Spacewatch || — || align=right | 2.5 km || 
|-id=710 bgcolor=#E9E9E9
| 272710 ||  || — || December 24, 2005 || Kitt Peak || Spacewatch || — || align=right | 1.9 km || 
|-id=711 bgcolor=#E9E9E9
| 272711 ||  || — || December 22, 2005 || Kitt Peak || Spacewatch || — || align=right | 1.9 km || 
|-id=712 bgcolor=#E9E9E9
| 272712 ||  || — || December 22, 2005 || Kitt Peak || Spacewatch || — || align=right | 2.3 km || 
|-id=713 bgcolor=#d6d6d6
| 272713 ||  || — || December 22, 2005 || Kitt Peak || Spacewatch || 628 || align=right | 2.4 km || 
|-id=714 bgcolor=#E9E9E9
| 272714 ||  || — || December 25, 2005 || Kitt Peak || Spacewatch || — || align=right | 1.6 km || 
|-id=715 bgcolor=#E9E9E9
| 272715 ||  || — || December 25, 2005 || Kitt Peak || Spacewatch || — || align=right | 1.7 km || 
|-id=716 bgcolor=#E9E9E9
| 272716 ||  || — || December 22, 2005 || Kitt Peak || Spacewatch || — || align=right | 1.5 km || 
|-id=717 bgcolor=#E9E9E9
| 272717 ||  || — || December 24, 2005 || Kitt Peak || Spacewatch || — || align=right | 1.4 km || 
|-id=718 bgcolor=#E9E9E9
| 272718 ||  || — || December 25, 2005 || Kitt Peak || Spacewatch || — || align=right | 2.4 km || 
|-id=719 bgcolor=#E9E9E9
| 272719 ||  || — || December 25, 2005 || Mount Lemmon || Mount Lemmon Survey || — || align=right | 2.0 km || 
|-id=720 bgcolor=#E9E9E9
| 272720 ||  || — || December 26, 2005 || Mount Lemmon || Mount Lemmon Survey || — || align=right | 2.0 km || 
|-id=721 bgcolor=#E9E9E9
| 272721 ||  || — || December 24, 2005 || Kitt Peak || Spacewatch || — || align=right | 1.8 km || 
|-id=722 bgcolor=#E9E9E9
| 272722 ||  || — || December 22, 2005 || Kitt Peak || Spacewatch || — || align=right | 2.2 km || 
|-id=723 bgcolor=#E9E9E9
| 272723 ||  || — || December 24, 2005 || Kitt Peak || Spacewatch || — || align=right | 1.3 km || 
|-id=724 bgcolor=#d6d6d6
| 272724 ||  || — || December 26, 2005 || Kitt Peak || Spacewatch || — || align=right | 4.2 km || 
|-id=725 bgcolor=#E9E9E9
| 272725 ||  || — || December 26, 2005 || Kitt Peak || Spacewatch || — || align=right | 1.2 km || 
|-id=726 bgcolor=#E9E9E9
| 272726 ||  || — || December 24, 2005 || Kitt Peak || Spacewatch || — || align=right | 2.2 km || 
|-id=727 bgcolor=#E9E9E9
| 272727 ||  || — || December 24, 2005 || Kitt Peak || Spacewatch || — || align=right | 1.5 km || 
|-id=728 bgcolor=#E9E9E9
| 272728 ||  || — || December 24, 2005 || Kitt Peak || Spacewatch || — || align=right | 1.4 km || 
|-id=729 bgcolor=#E9E9E9
| 272729 ||  || — || December 24, 2005 || Kitt Peak || Spacewatch || — || align=right | 2.3 km || 
|-id=730 bgcolor=#fefefe
| 272730 ||  || — || December 24, 2005 || Kitt Peak || Spacewatch || NYS || align=right data-sort-value="0.99" | 990 m || 
|-id=731 bgcolor=#E9E9E9
| 272731 ||  || — || December 24, 2005 || Kitt Peak || Spacewatch || MAR || align=right | 1.5 km || 
|-id=732 bgcolor=#d6d6d6
| 272732 ||  || — || December 25, 2005 || Kitt Peak || Spacewatch || — || align=right | 5.2 km || 
|-id=733 bgcolor=#E9E9E9
| 272733 ||  || — || December 26, 2005 || Mount Lemmon || Mount Lemmon Survey || HNS || align=right | 1.7 km || 
|-id=734 bgcolor=#E9E9E9
| 272734 ||  || — || December 23, 2005 || Palomar || NEAT || — || align=right | 3.2 km || 
|-id=735 bgcolor=#E9E9E9
| 272735 ||  || — || December 23, 2005 || Kitt Peak || Spacewatch || — || align=right | 2.7 km || 
|-id=736 bgcolor=#E9E9E9
| 272736 ||  || — || December 27, 2005 || Catalina || CSS || — || align=right | 2.7 km || 
|-id=737 bgcolor=#E9E9E9
| 272737 ||  || — || December 28, 2005 || Kitt Peak || Spacewatch || — || align=right | 2.0 km || 
|-id=738 bgcolor=#E9E9E9
| 272738 ||  || — || December 25, 2005 || Kitt Peak || Spacewatch || AGN || align=right | 1.6 km || 
|-id=739 bgcolor=#E9E9E9
| 272739 ||  || — || December 25, 2005 || Kitt Peak || Spacewatch || — || align=right | 2.4 km || 
|-id=740 bgcolor=#E9E9E9
| 272740 ||  || — || December 25, 2005 || Kitt Peak || Spacewatch || — || align=right | 1.8 km || 
|-id=741 bgcolor=#E9E9E9
| 272741 ||  || — || December 25, 2005 || Kitt Peak || Spacewatch || — || align=right | 2.0 km || 
|-id=742 bgcolor=#E9E9E9
| 272742 ||  || — || December 25, 2005 || Kitt Peak || Spacewatch || — || align=right | 2.9 km || 
|-id=743 bgcolor=#E9E9E9
| 272743 ||  || — || December 25, 2005 || Kitt Peak || Spacewatch || — || align=right | 1.6 km || 
|-id=744 bgcolor=#E9E9E9
| 272744 ||  || — || December 25, 2005 || Kitt Peak || Spacewatch || — || align=right | 2.4 km || 
|-id=745 bgcolor=#E9E9E9
| 272745 ||  || — || December 25, 2005 || Kitt Peak || Spacewatch || MIS || align=right | 3.8 km || 
|-id=746 bgcolor=#E9E9E9
| 272746 Paoladiomede ||  ||  || December 29, 2005 || Suno || S. Foglia || DOR || align=right | 2.3 km || 
|-id=747 bgcolor=#E9E9E9
| 272747 ||  || — || December 25, 2005 || Mount Lemmon || Mount Lemmon Survey || — || align=right | 5.6 km || 
|-id=748 bgcolor=#E9E9E9
| 272748 ||  || — || December 25, 2005 || Mount Lemmon || Mount Lemmon Survey || — || align=right | 1.9 km || 
|-id=749 bgcolor=#E9E9E9
| 272749 ||  || — || December 25, 2005 || Mount Lemmon || Mount Lemmon Survey || — || align=right | 1.8 km || 
|-id=750 bgcolor=#E9E9E9
| 272750 ||  || — || December 26, 2005 || Kitt Peak || Spacewatch || — || align=right | 1.9 km || 
|-id=751 bgcolor=#E9E9E9
| 272751 ||  || — || December 28, 2005 || Mount Lemmon || Mount Lemmon Survey || — || align=right | 1.9 km || 
|-id=752 bgcolor=#d6d6d6
| 272752 ||  || — || December 28, 2005 || Mount Lemmon || Mount Lemmon Survey || HYG || align=right | 3.2 km || 
|-id=753 bgcolor=#E9E9E9
| 272753 ||  || — || December 28, 2005 || Mount Lemmon || Mount Lemmon Survey || — || align=right | 1.5 km || 
|-id=754 bgcolor=#d6d6d6
| 272754 ||  || — || December 28, 2005 || Mount Lemmon || Mount Lemmon Survey || — || align=right | 2.7 km || 
|-id=755 bgcolor=#E9E9E9
| 272755 ||  || — || December 28, 2005 || Mount Lemmon || Mount Lemmon Survey || — || align=right | 2.4 km || 
|-id=756 bgcolor=#d6d6d6
| 272756 ||  || — || December 29, 2005 || Socorro || LINEAR || — || align=right | 5.0 km || 
|-id=757 bgcolor=#E9E9E9
| 272757 ||  || — || December 25, 2005 || Kitt Peak || Spacewatch || — || align=right | 2.3 km || 
|-id=758 bgcolor=#E9E9E9
| 272758 ||  || — || December 25, 2005 || Kitt Peak || Spacewatch || — || align=right | 1.9 km || 
|-id=759 bgcolor=#E9E9E9
| 272759 ||  || — || December 25, 2005 || Kitt Peak || Spacewatch || — || align=right | 1.2 km || 
|-id=760 bgcolor=#E9E9E9
| 272760 ||  || — || December 27, 2005 || Mount Lemmon || Mount Lemmon Survey || MAR || align=right | 1.6 km || 
|-id=761 bgcolor=#E9E9E9
| 272761 ||  || — || December 28, 2005 || Catalina || CSS || — || align=right | 3.4 km || 
|-id=762 bgcolor=#E9E9E9
| 272762 ||  || — || December 27, 2005 || Kitt Peak || Spacewatch || — || align=right | 2.0 km || 
|-id=763 bgcolor=#E9E9E9
| 272763 ||  || — || December 27, 2005 || Kitt Peak || Spacewatch || — || align=right | 2.7 km || 
|-id=764 bgcolor=#E9E9E9
| 272764 ||  || — || December 27, 2005 || Kitt Peak || Spacewatch || — || align=right | 1.5 km || 
|-id=765 bgcolor=#E9E9E9
| 272765 ||  || — || December 22, 2005 || Catalina || CSS || GER || align=right | 2.6 km || 
|-id=766 bgcolor=#E9E9E9
| 272766 ||  || — || December 23, 2005 || Socorro || LINEAR || — || align=right | 3.3 km || 
|-id=767 bgcolor=#E9E9E9
| 272767 ||  || — || December 29, 2005 || Palomar || NEAT || RAF || align=right | 1.4 km || 
|-id=768 bgcolor=#E9E9E9
| 272768 ||  || — || December 30, 2005 || Socorro || LINEAR || — || align=right | 1.6 km || 
|-id=769 bgcolor=#E9E9E9
| 272769 ||  || — || December 22, 2005 || Kitt Peak || Spacewatch || — || align=right | 1.2 km || 
|-id=770 bgcolor=#E9E9E9
| 272770 ||  || — || December 28, 2005 || Mount Lemmon || Mount Lemmon Survey || — || align=right | 4.5 km || 
|-id=771 bgcolor=#d6d6d6
| 272771 ||  || — || December 30, 2005 || Mount Lemmon || Mount Lemmon Survey || EOS || align=right | 2.4 km || 
|-id=772 bgcolor=#E9E9E9
| 272772 ||  || — || December 28, 2005 || Catalina || CSS || — || align=right | 3.5 km || 
|-id=773 bgcolor=#E9E9E9
| 272773 ||  || — || December 29, 2005 || Kitt Peak || Spacewatch || — || align=right | 2.5 km || 
|-id=774 bgcolor=#E9E9E9
| 272774 ||  || — || December 30, 2005 || Kitt Peak || Spacewatch || — || align=right | 2.5 km || 
|-id=775 bgcolor=#E9E9E9
| 272775 ||  || — || December 30, 2005 || Kitt Peak || Spacewatch || — || align=right | 2.8 km || 
|-id=776 bgcolor=#E9E9E9
| 272776 ||  || — || December 24, 2005 || Catalina || CSS || — || align=right | 3.8 km || 
|-id=777 bgcolor=#E9E9E9
| 272777 ||  || — || December 24, 2005 || Kitt Peak || Spacewatch || — || align=right | 2.3 km || 
|-id=778 bgcolor=#E9E9E9
| 272778 ||  || — || December 25, 2005 || Kitt Peak || Spacewatch || — || align=right | 1.8 km || 
|-id=779 bgcolor=#E9E9E9
| 272779 ||  || — || December 28, 2005 || Kitt Peak || Spacewatch || — || align=right | 1.8 km || 
|-id=780 bgcolor=#E9E9E9
| 272780 ||  || — || December 28, 2005 || Catalina || CSS || — || align=right | 2.0 km || 
|-id=781 bgcolor=#E9E9E9
| 272781 ||  || — || December 22, 2005 || Catalina || CSS || MAR || align=right | 2.1 km || 
|-id=782 bgcolor=#E9E9E9
| 272782 ||  || — || December 23, 2005 || Socorro || LINEAR || — || align=right | 2.0 km || 
|-id=783 bgcolor=#E9E9E9
| 272783 ||  || — || December 29, 2005 || Socorro || LINEAR || — || align=right | 1.8 km || 
|-id=784 bgcolor=#d6d6d6
| 272784 ||  || — || December 26, 2005 || Mount Lemmon || Mount Lemmon Survey || — || align=right | 3.9 km || 
|-id=785 bgcolor=#E9E9E9
| 272785 ||  || — || December 28, 2005 || Mount Lemmon || Mount Lemmon Survey || — || align=right | 3.2 km || 
|-id=786 bgcolor=#E9E9E9
| 272786 ||  || — || December 29, 2005 || Kitt Peak || Spacewatch || — || align=right | 1.4 km || 
|-id=787 bgcolor=#E9E9E9
| 272787 ||  || — || December 28, 2005 || Kitt Peak || Spacewatch || — || align=right | 1.7 km || 
|-id=788 bgcolor=#E9E9E9
| 272788 ||  || — || December 22, 2005 || Kitt Peak || Spacewatch || — || align=right | 1.0 km || 
|-id=789 bgcolor=#E9E9E9
| 272789 ||  || — || December 22, 2005 || Kitt Peak || Spacewatch || — || align=right | 1.7 km || 
|-id=790 bgcolor=#E9E9E9
| 272790 ||  || — || December 25, 2005 || Kitt Peak || Spacewatch || — || align=right | 1.6 km || 
|-id=791 bgcolor=#E9E9E9
| 272791 ||  || — || December 25, 2005 || Kitt Peak || Spacewatch || — || align=right | 1.5 km || 
|-id=792 bgcolor=#E9E9E9
| 272792 ||  || — || December 25, 2005 || Mount Lemmon || Mount Lemmon Survey || — || align=right | 3.2 km || 
|-id=793 bgcolor=#E9E9E9
| 272793 ||  || — || December 29, 2005 || Kitt Peak || Spacewatch || DOR || align=right | 3.3 km || 
|-id=794 bgcolor=#E9E9E9
| 272794 ||  || — || December 30, 2005 || Mount Lemmon || Mount Lemmon Survey || HOF || align=right | 3.8 km || 
|-id=795 bgcolor=#E9E9E9
| 272795 ||  || — || December 29, 2005 || Mount Lemmon || Mount Lemmon Survey || — || align=right | 1.5 km || 
|-id=796 bgcolor=#d6d6d6
| 272796 ||  || — || December 28, 2005 || Mount Lemmon || Mount Lemmon Survey || KOR || align=right | 1.5 km || 
|-id=797 bgcolor=#E9E9E9
| 272797 ||  || — || January 2, 2006 || Mount Lemmon || Mount Lemmon Survey || — || align=right | 2.9 km || 
|-id=798 bgcolor=#E9E9E9
| 272798 ||  || — || January 5, 2006 || Anderson Mesa || LONEOS || — || align=right | 2.6 km || 
|-id=799 bgcolor=#E9E9E9
| 272799 ||  || — || January 4, 2006 || Mount Lemmon || Mount Lemmon Survey || — || align=right | 3.8 km || 
|-id=800 bgcolor=#fefefe
| 272800 ||  || — || January 5, 2006 || Mount Lemmon || Mount Lemmon Survey || — || align=right | 1.3 km || 
|}

272801–272900 

|-bgcolor=#E9E9E9
| 272801 ||  || — || January 5, 2006 || Mount Lemmon || Mount Lemmon Survey || — || align=right | 4.1 km || 
|-id=802 bgcolor=#E9E9E9
| 272802 ||  || — || January 5, 2006 || Mount Lemmon || Mount Lemmon Survey || — || align=right | 3.1 km || 
|-id=803 bgcolor=#E9E9E9
| 272803 ||  || — || January 5, 2006 || Socorro || LINEAR || — || align=right | 3.4 km || 
|-id=804 bgcolor=#E9E9E9
| 272804 ||  || — || January 4, 2006 || Catalina || CSS || — || align=right | 3.3 km || 
|-id=805 bgcolor=#E9E9E9
| 272805 ||  || — || January 5, 2006 || Anderson Mesa || LONEOS || GEF || align=right | 1.8 km || 
|-id=806 bgcolor=#E9E9E9
| 272806 ||  || — || January 5, 2006 || Catalina || CSS || CLO || align=right | 2.4 km || 
|-id=807 bgcolor=#E9E9E9
| 272807 ||  || — || January 6, 2006 || Socorro || LINEAR || — || align=right | 1.6 km || 
|-id=808 bgcolor=#E9E9E9
| 272808 ||  || — || January 6, 2006 || Kitt Peak || Spacewatch || — || align=right | 2.2 km || 
|-id=809 bgcolor=#E9E9E9
| 272809 ||  || — || January 6, 2006 || Mount Lemmon || Mount Lemmon Survey || — || align=right | 1.5 km || 
|-id=810 bgcolor=#E9E9E9
| 272810 ||  || — || January 6, 2006 || Catalina || CSS || — || align=right | 2.9 km || 
|-id=811 bgcolor=#E9E9E9
| 272811 ||  || — || January 7, 2006 || Mount Lemmon || Mount Lemmon Survey || — || align=right | 2.0 km || 
|-id=812 bgcolor=#E9E9E9
| 272812 ||  || — || January 6, 2006 || Kitt Peak || Spacewatch || — || align=right | 1.8 km || 
|-id=813 bgcolor=#d6d6d6
| 272813 ||  || — || January 6, 2006 || Kitt Peak || Spacewatch || CHA || align=right | 2.6 km || 
|-id=814 bgcolor=#E9E9E9
| 272814 ||  || — || January 8, 2006 || Mount Lemmon || Mount Lemmon Survey || — || align=right | 3.7 km || 
|-id=815 bgcolor=#E9E9E9
| 272815 ||  || — || January 8, 2006 || Mount Lemmon || Mount Lemmon Survey || — || align=right | 3.7 km || 
|-id=816 bgcolor=#E9E9E9
| 272816 ||  || — || January 5, 2006 || Kitt Peak || Spacewatch || — || align=right | 2.3 km || 
|-id=817 bgcolor=#d6d6d6
| 272817 ||  || — || January 4, 2006 || Kitt Peak || Spacewatch || KOR || align=right | 1.6 km || 
|-id=818 bgcolor=#E9E9E9
| 272818 ||  || — || January 6, 2006 || Kitt Peak || Spacewatch || ADE || align=right | 3.7 km || 
|-id=819 bgcolor=#E9E9E9
| 272819 ||  || — || January 5, 2006 || Mount Lemmon || Mount Lemmon Survey || WIT || align=right | 1.3 km || 
|-id=820 bgcolor=#E9E9E9
| 272820 ||  || — || January 6, 2006 || Kitt Peak || Spacewatch || — || align=right | 2.5 km || 
|-id=821 bgcolor=#E9E9E9
| 272821 ||  || — || January 6, 2006 || Kitt Peak || Spacewatch || — || align=right | 3.9 km || 
|-id=822 bgcolor=#E9E9E9
| 272822 ||  || — || January 7, 2006 || Kitt Peak || Spacewatch || — || align=right | 1.9 km || 
|-id=823 bgcolor=#d6d6d6
| 272823 ||  || — || January 8, 2006 || Mount Lemmon || Mount Lemmon Survey || — || align=right | 4.2 km || 
|-id=824 bgcolor=#E9E9E9
| 272824 ||  || — || January 7, 2006 || Socorro || LINEAR || — || align=right | 3.4 km || 
|-id=825 bgcolor=#E9E9E9
| 272825 ||  || — || January 7, 2006 || Mount Lemmon || Mount Lemmon Survey || — || align=right | 1.8 km || 
|-id=826 bgcolor=#E9E9E9
| 272826 ||  || — || January 7, 2006 || Kitt Peak || Spacewatch || — || align=right | 1.7 km || 
|-id=827 bgcolor=#E9E9E9
| 272827 ||  || — || January 7, 2006 || Anderson Mesa || LONEOS || — || align=right | 3.2 km || 
|-id=828 bgcolor=#E9E9E9
| 272828 ||  || — || January 7, 2006 || Mount Lemmon || Mount Lemmon Survey || HOF || align=right | 2.7 km || 
|-id=829 bgcolor=#E9E9E9
| 272829 ||  || — || January 7, 2006 || Kitt Peak || Spacewatch || — || align=right | 2.2 km || 
|-id=830 bgcolor=#E9E9E9
| 272830 ||  || — || January 9, 2006 || Mount Lemmon || Mount Lemmon Survey || — || align=right | 3.1 km || 
|-id=831 bgcolor=#E9E9E9
| 272831 ||  || — || January 7, 2006 || Mount Lemmon || Mount Lemmon Survey || PAD || align=right | 1.5 km || 
|-id=832 bgcolor=#fefefe
| 272832 ||  || — || January 20, 2006 || Socorro || LINEAR || H || align=right | 1.0 km || 
|-id=833 bgcolor=#E9E9E9
| 272833 ||  || — || January 20, 2006 || Kitt Peak || Spacewatch || WIT || align=right | 1.5 km || 
|-id=834 bgcolor=#E9E9E9
| 272834 ||  || — || January 20, 2006 || Kitt Peak || Spacewatch || — || align=right | 2.3 km || 
|-id=835 bgcolor=#E9E9E9
| 272835 ||  || — || January 20, 2006 || Catalina || CSS || — || align=right | 2.9 km || 
|-id=836 bgcolor=#E9E9E9
| 272836 ||  || — || January 21, 2006 || Kitt Peak || Spacewatch || — || align=right | 1.2 km || 
|-id=837 bgcolor=#d6d6d6
| 272837 ||  || — || January 20, 2006 || Kitt Peak || Spacewatch || KOR || align=right | 1.6 km || 
|-id=838 bgcolor=#E9E9E9
| 272838 ||  || — || January 22, 2006 || Catalina || CSS || — || align=right | 2.5 km || 
|-id=839 bgcolor=#d6d6d6
| 272839 ||  || — || January 22, 2006 || Anderson Mesa || LONEOS || — || align=right | 5.0 km || 
|-id=840 bgcolor=#E9E9E9
| 272840 ||  || — || January 22, 2006 || Mount Lemmon || Mount Lemmon Survey || — || align=right | 2.5 km || 
|-id=841 bgcolor=#E9E9E9
| 272841 ||  || — || January 22, 2006 || Mount Lemmon || Mount Lemmon Survey || NEM || align=right | 2.5 km || 
|-id=842 bgcolor=#E9E9E9
| 272842 ||  || — || January 22, 2006 || Anderson Mesa || LONEOS || CLO || align=right | 2.9 km || 
|-id=843 bgcolor=#d6d6d6
| 272843 ||  || — || January 22, 2006 || Mount Lemmon || Mount Lemmon Survey || — || align=right | 4.2 km || 
|-id=844 bgcolor=#E9E9E9
| 272844 ||  || — || January 23, 2006 || Nyukasa || Mount Nyukasa Stn. || — || align=right | 1.3 km || 
|-id=845 bgcolor=#E9E9E9
| 272845 ||  || — || January 23, 2006 || Nyukasa || Mount Nyukasa Stn. || XIZ || align=right | 2.0 km || 
|-id=846 bgcolor=#E9E9E9
| 272846 ||  || — || January 20, 2006 || Kitt Peak || Spacewatch || — || align=right | 1.9 km || 
|-id=847 bgcolor=#E9E9E9
| 272847 ||  || — || January 20, 2006 || Kitt Peak || Spacewatch || NEM || align=right | 2.9 km || 
|-id=848 bgcolor=#E9E9E9
| 272848 ||  || — || January 20, 2006 || Kitt Peak || Spacewatch || — || align=right | 3.4 km || 
|-id=849 bgcolor=#d6d6d6
| 272849 ||  || — || January 21, 2006 || Kitt Peak || Spacewatch || 615 || align=right | 1.7 km || 
|-id=850 bgcolor=#d6d6d6
| 272850 ||  || — || January 21, 2006 || Kitt Peak || Spacewatch || — || align=right | 3.1 km || 
|-id=851 bgcolor=#E9E9E9
| 272851 ||  || — || January 21, 2006 || Kitt Peak || Spacewatch || — || align=right | 3.8 km || 
|-id=852 bgcolor=#E9E9E9
| 272852 ||  || — || January 23, 2006 || Mount Lemmon || Mount Lemmon Survey || NEM || align=right | 3.2 km || 
|-id=853 bgcolor=#E9E9E9
| 272853 ||  || — || January 24, 2006 || Nyukasa || Mount Nyukasa Stn. || — || align=right | 2.4 km || 
|-id=854 bgcolor=#d6d6d6
| 272854 ||  || — || January 21, 2006 || Kitt Peak || Spacewatch || — || align=right | 2.9 km || 
|-id=855 bgcolor=#E9E9E9
| 272855 ||  || — || January 23, 2006 || Kitt Peak || Spacewatch || — || align=right | 2.9 km || 
|-id=856 bgcolor=#d6d6d6
| 272856 ||  || — || January 23, 2006 || Catalina || CSS || — || align=right | 3.6 km || 
|-id=857 bgcolor=#E9E9E9
| 272857 ||  || — || January 23, 2006 || Mount Lemmon || Mount Lemmon Survey || — || align=right | 4.7 km || 
|-id=858 bgcolor=#E9E9E9
| 272858 ||  || — || January 25, 2006 || Mount Lemmon || Mount Lemmon Survey || — || align=right | 2.7 km || 
|-id=859 bgcolor=#d6d6d6
| 272859 ||  || — || January 25, 2006 || Kitt Peak || Spacewatch || EOS || align=right | 2.0 km || 
|-id=860 bgcolor=#E9E9E9
| 272860 ||  || — || January 22, 2006 || Anderson Mesa || LONEOS || — || align=right | 3.4 km || 
|-id=861 bgcolor=#E9E9E9
| 272861 ||  || — || January 23, 2006 || Catalina || CSS || — || align=right | 3.8 km || 
|-id=862 bgcolor=#d6d6d6
| 272862 ||  || — || January 26, 2006 || Kitt Peak || Spacewatch || EOS || align=right | 2.3 km || 
|-id=863 bgcolor=#E9E9E9
| 272863 ||  || — || January 23, 2006 || Kitt Peak || Spacewatch || AEO || align=right | 2.3 km || 
|-id=864 bgcolor=#d6d6d6
| 272864 ||  || — || January 23, 2006 || Kitt Peak || Spacewatch || — || align=right | 3.6 km || 
|-id=865 bgcolor=#E9E9E9
| 272865 ||  || — || January 23, 2006 || Kitt Peak || Spacewatch || — || align=right | 1.4 km || 
|-id=866 bgcolor=#E9E9E9
| 272866 ||  || — || January 23, 2006 || Kitt Peak || Spacewatch || NEM || align=right | 3.1 km || 
|-id=867 bgcolor=#d6d6d6
| 272867 ||  || — || January 23, 2006 || Kitt Peak || Spacewatch || EMA || align=right | 5.6 km || 
|-id=868 bgcolor=#E9E9E9
| 272868 ||  || — || January 23, 2006 || Kitt Peak || Spacewatch || — || align=right | 3.5 km || 
|-id=869 bgcolor=#d6d6d6
| 272869 ||  || — || January 23, 2006 || Kitt Peak || Spacewatch || — || align=right | 3.3 km || 
|-id=870 bgcolor=#E9E9E9
| 272870 ||  || — || January 23, 2006 || Kitt Peak || Spacewatch || — || align=right | 3.5 km || 
|-id=871 bgcolor=#E9E9E9
| 272871 ||  || — || January 23, 2006 || Kitt Peak || Spacewatch || — || align=right | 2.5 km || 
|-id=872 bgcolor=#E9E9E9
| 272872 ||  || — || January 23, 2006 || Kitt Peak || Spacewatch || — || align=right | 2.9 km || 
|-id=873 bgcolor=#E9E9E9
| 272873 ||  || — || January 24, 2006 || Kitt Peak || Spacewatch || — || align=right | 2.3 km || 
|-id=874 bgcolor=#d6d6d6
| 272874 ||  || — || January 24, 2006 || Socorro || LINEAR || — || align=right | 4.6 km || 
|-id=875 bgcolor=#E9E9E9
| 272875 ||  || — || January 25, 2006 || Kitt Peak || Spacewatch || — || align=right | 2.2 km || 
|-id=876 bgcolor=#E9E9E9
| 272876 ||  || — || January 26, 2006 || Mount Lemmon || Mount Lemmon Survey || — || align=right | 3.4 km || 
|-id=877 bgcolor=#d6d6d6
| 272877 ||  || — || January 26, 2006 || Kitt Peak || Spacewatch || — || align=right | 4.5 km || 
|-id=878 bgcolor=#d6d6d6
| 272878 ||  || — || January 26, 2006 || Kitt Peak || Spacewatch || KOR || align=right | 1.6 km || 
|-id=879 bgcolor=#E9E9E9
| 272879 ||  || — || January 26, 2006 || Kitt Peak || Spacewatch || — || align=right | 1.9 km || 
|-id=880 bgcolor=#d6d6d6
| 272880 ||  || — || January 26, 2006 || Kitt Peak || Spacewatch || — || align=right | 2.6 km || 
|-id=881 bgcolor=#E9E9E9
| 272881 ||  || — || January 26, 2006 || Mount Lemmon || Mount Lemmon Survey || — || align=right | 3.0 km || 
|-id=882 bgcolor=#d6d6d6
| 272882 ||  || — || January 26, 2006 || Mount Lemmon || Mount Lemmon Survey || — || align=right | 2.6 km || 
|-id=883 bgcolor=#E9E9E9
| 272883 ||  || — || January 27, 2006 || Mount Lemmon || Mount Lemmon Survey || — || align=right | 2.2 km || 
|-id=884 bgcolor=#E9E9E9
| 272884 ||  || — || January 18, 2006 || Catalina || CSS || — || align=right | 2.7 km || 
|-id=885 bgcolor=#E9E9E9
| 272885 ||  || — || January 23, 2006 || Mount Lemmon || Mount Lemmon Survey || HOF || align=right | 2.8 km || 
|-id=886 bgcolor=#d6d6d6
| 272886 ||  || — || January 25, 2006 || Kitt Peak || Spacewatch || — || align=right | 3.3 km || 
|-id=887 bgcolor=#E9E9E9
| 272887 ||  || — || January 25, 2006 || Kitt Peak || Spacewatch || HEN || align=right | 1.5 km || 
|-id=888 bgcolor=#E9E9E9
| 272888 ||  || — || January 26, 2006 || Kitt Peak || Spacewatch || — || align=right | 2.6 km || 
|-id=889 bgcolor=#E9E9E9
| 272889 ||  || — || January 26, 2006 || Kitt Peak || Spacewatch || GEF || align=right | 1.4 km || 
|-id=890 bgcolor=#E9E9E9
| 272890 ||  || — || January 26, 2006 || Mount Lemmon || Mount Lemmon Survey || — || align=right | 1.4 km || 
|-id=891 bgcolor=#E9E9E9
| 272891 ||  || — || January 26, 2006 || Kitt Peak || Spacewatch || HOF || align=right | 3.5 km || 
|-id=892 bgcolor=#E9E9E9
| 272892 ||  || — || January 26, 2006 || Kitt Peak || Spacewatch || AST || align=right | 3.0 km || 
|-id=893 bgcolor=#E9E9E9
| 272893 ||  || — || January 26, 2006 || Kitt Peak || Spacewatch || AGN || align=right | 1.4 km || 
|-id=894 bgcolor=#d6d6d6
| 272894 ||  || — || January 26, 2006 || Kitt Peak || Spacewatch || — || align=right | 2.4 km || 
|-id=895 bgcolor=#E9E9E9
| 272895 ||  || — || January 26, 2006 || Kitt Peak || Spacewatch || — || align=right | 2.3 km || 
|-id=896 bgcolor=#E9E9E9
| 272896 ||  || — || January 26, 2006 || Kitt Peak || Spacewatch || PAD || align=right | 2.3 km || 
|-id=897 bgcolor=#E9E9E9
| 272897 ||  || — || January 26, 2006 || Kitt Peak || Spacewatch || — || align=right | 2.6 km || 
|-id=898 bgcolor=#d6d6d6
| 272898 ||  || — || January 26, 2006 || Kitt Peak || Spacewatch || KOR || align=right | 1.8 km || 
|-id=899 bgcolor=#E9E9E9
| 272899 ||  || — || January 26, 2006 || Mount Lemmon || Mount Lemmon Survey || HOF || align=right | 3.4 km || 
|-id=900 bgcolor=#E9E9E9
| 272900 ||  || — || January 23, 2006 || Socorro || LINEAR || — || align=right | 3.2 km || 
|}

272901–273000 

|-bgcolor=#E9E9E9
| 272901 ||  || — || January 24, 2006 || Anderson Mesa || LONEOS || ADE || align=right | 3.0 km || 
|-id=902 bgcolor=#E9E9E9
| 272902 ||  || — || January 25, 2006 || Kitt Peak || Spacewatch || — || align=right | 2.5 km || 
|-id=903 bgcolor=#E9E9E9
| 272903 ||  || — || January 25, 2006 || Kitt Peak || Spacewatch || — || align=right | 1.4 km || 
|-id=904 bgcolor=#E9E9E9
| 272904 ||  || — || January 25, 2006 || Kitt Peak || Spacewatch || — || align=right | 3.0 km || 
|-id=905 bgcolor=#d6d6d6
| 272905 ||  || — || January 25, 2006 || Kitt Peak || Spacewatch || — || align=right | 2.3 km || 
|-id=906 bgcolor=#E9E9E9
| 272906 ||  || — || January 26, 2006 || Kitt Peak || Spacewatch || — || align=right | 2.1 km || 
|-id=907 bgcolor=#d6d6d6
| 272907 ||  || — || January 26, 2006 || Catalina || CSS || — || align=right | 4.9 km || 
|-id=908 bgcolor=#E9E9E9
| 272908 ||  || — || January 26, 2006 || Catalina || CSS || HNA || align=right | 3.0 km || 
|-id=909 bgcolor=#E9E9E9
| 272909 ||  || — || January 26, 2006 || Kitt Peak || Spacewatch || — || align=right | 3.3 km || 
|-id=910 bgcolor=#E9E9E9
| 272910 ||  || — || January 26, 2006 || Catalina || CSS || HNA || align=right | 2.7 km || 
|-id=911 bgcolor=#E9E9E9
| 272911 ||  || — || January 26, 2006 || Mount Lemmon || Mount Lemmon Survey || GEF || align=right | 1.6 km || 
|-id=912 bgcolor=#E9E9E9
| 272912 ||  || — || January 26, 2006 || Kitt Peak || Spacewatch || — || align=right | 2.8 km || 
|-id=913 bgcolor=#d6d6d6
| 272913 ||  || — || January 26, 2006 || Mount Lemmon || Mount Lemmon Survey || — || align=right | 2.5 km || 
|-id=914 bgcolor=#E9E9E9
| 272914 ||  || — || January 26, 2006 || Mount Lemmon || Mount Lemmon Survey || XIZ || align=right | 1.5 km || 
|-id=915 bgcolor=#E9E9E9
| 272915 ||  || — || January 27, 2006 || Kitt Peak || Spacewatch || — || align=right | 1.1 km || 
|-id=916 bgcolor=#d6d6d6
| 272916 ||  || — || January 27, 2006 || Mount Lemmon || Mount Lemmon Survey || — || align=right | 3.1 km || 
|-id=917 bgcolor=#d6d6d6
| 272917 ||  || — || January 27, 2006 || Mount Lemmon || Mount Lemmon Survey || EOS || align=right | 2.2 km || 
|-id=918 bgcolor=#E9E9E9
| 272918 ||  || — || January 28, 2006 || Mount Lemmon || Mount Lemmon Survey || AGN || align=right | 1.4 km || 
|-id=919 bgcolor=#E9E9E9
| 272919 ||  || — || January 28, 2006 || Kitt Peak || Spacewatch || NEM || align=right | 2.8 km || 
|-id=920 bgcolor=#E9E9E9
| 272920 ||  || — || January 30, 2006 || Kitt Peak || Spacewatch || — || align=right | 3.3 km || 
|-id=921 bgcolor=#E9E9E9
| 272921 ||  || — || January 30, 2006 || Kitt Peak || Spacewatch || — || align=right | 3.2 km || 
|-id=922 bgcolor=#E9E9E9
| 272922 ||  || — || January 30, 2006 || Kitt Peak || Spacewatch || AGN || align=right | 1.6 km || 
|-id=923 bgcolor=#E9E9E9
| 272923 ||  || — || January 30, 2006 || Catalina || CSS || — || align=right | 2.9 km || 
|-id=924 bgcolor=#d6d6d6
| 272924 ||  || — || January 30, 2006 || Kitt Peak || Spacewatch || — || align=right | 2.3 km || 
|-id=925 bgcolor=#E9E9E9
| 272925 ||  || — || January 31, 2006 || Kitt Peak || Spacewatch || HOF || align=right | 2.6 km || 
|-id=926 bgcolor=#E9E9E9
| 272926 ||  || — || January 31, 2006 || Catalina || CSS || — || align=right | 3.2 km || 
|-id=927 bgcolor=#d6d6d6
| 272927 ||  || — || January 31, 2006 || Kitt Peak || Spacewatch || THM || align=right | 2.5 km || 
|-id=928 bgcolor=#d6d6d6
| 272928 ||  || — || January 31, 2006 || Kitt Peak || Spacewatch || KOR || align=right | 1.5 km || 
|-id=929 bgcolor=#E9E9E9
| 272929 ||  || — || January 30, 2006 || BlackBird || K. Levin || — || align=right | 1.7 km || 
|-id=930 bgcolor=#E9E9E9
| 272930 ||  || — || January 30, 2006 || Kitt Peak || Spacewatch || — || align=right | 3.4 km || 
|-id=931 bgcolor=#E9E9E9
| 272931 ||  || — || January 30, 2006 || Kitt Peak || Spacewatch || HEN || align=right | 1.4 km || 
|-id=932 bgcolor=#E9E9E9
| 272932 ||  || — || January 30, 2006 || Kitt Peak || Spacewatch || — || align=right | 3.4 km || 
|-id=933 bgcolor=#E9E9E9
| 272933 ||  || — || January 30, 2006 || Kitt Peak || Spacewatch || — || align=right | 2.6 km || 
|-id=934 bgcolor=#E9E9E9
| 272934 ||  || — || January 31, 2006 || Kitt Peak || Spacewatch || HEN || align=right | 1.5 km || 
|-id=935 bgcolor=#E9E9E9
| 272935 ||  || — || January 31, 2006 || Kitt Peak || Spacewatch || GEF || align=right | 1.8 km || 
|-id=936 bgcolor=#E9E9E9
| 272936 ||  || — || January 31, 2006 || Kitt Peak || Spacewatch || AST || align=right | 2.5 km || 
|-id=937 bgcolor=#E9E9E9
| 272937 ||  || — || January 31, 2006 || Kitt Peak || Spacewatch || HEN || align=right | 1.2 km || 
|-id=938 bgcolor=#E9E9E9
| 272938 ||  || — || January 31, 2006 || Kitt Peak || Spacewatch || PAD || align=right | 2.0 km || 
|-id=939 bgcolor=#fefefe
| 272939 ||  || — || January 31, 2006 || Mount Lemmon || Mount Lemmon Survey || H || align=right data-sort-value="0.97" | 970 m || 
|-id=940 bgcolor=#E9E9E9
| 272940 ||  || — || January 31, 2006 || Catalina || CSS || CLO || align=right | 3.2 km || 
|-id=941 bgcolor=#E9E9E9
| 272941 ||  || — || January 23, 2006 || Mount Lemmon || Mount Lemmon Survey || — || align=right | 1.2 km || 
|-id=942 bgcolor=#E9E9E9
| 272942 ||  || — || January 23, 2006 || Kitt Peak || Spacewatch || WIT || align=right | 1.5 km || 
|-id=943 bgcolor=#d6d6d6
| 272943 ||  || — || January 25, 2006 || Kitt Peak || Spacewatch || — || align=right | 2.7 km || 
|-id=944 bgcolor=#d6d6d6
| 272944 ||  || — || January 21, 2006 || Kitt Peak || Spacewatch || — || align=right | 3.8 km || 
|-id=945 bgcolor=#d6d6d6
| 272945 ||  || — || January 27, 2006 || Mount Lemmon || Mount Lemmon Survey || KAR || align=right | 1.3 km || 
|-id=946 bgcolor=#E9E9E9
| 272946 ||  || — || January 26, 2006 || Mount Lemmon || Mount Lemmon Survey || HOF || align=right | 3.3 km || 
|-id=947 bgcolor=#d6d6d6
| 272947 ||  || — || January 21, 2006 || Mount Lemmon || Mount Lemmon Survey || EOS || align=right | 2.1 km || 
|-id=948 bgcolor=#d6d6d6
| 272948 ||  || — || January 21, 2006 || Kitt Peak || Spacewatch || — || align=right | 3.8 km || 
|-id=949 bgcolor=#E9E9E9
| 272949 ||  || — || January 25, 2006 || Kitt Peak || Spacewatch || HOF || align=right | 2.9 km || 
|-id=950 bgcolor=#E9E9E9
| 272950 ||  || — || January 23, 2006 || Kitt Peak || Spacewatch || — || align=right | 2.8 km || 
|-id=951 bgcolor=#E9E9E9
| 272951 ||  || — || February 1, 2006 || Kitt Peak || Spacewatch || XIZ || align=right | 1.5 km || 
|-id=952 bgcolor=#E9E9E9
| 272952 ||  || — || February 1, 2006 || Mount Lemmon || Mount Lemmon Survey || MIS || align=right | 3.5 km || 
|-id=953 bgcolor=#E9E9E9
| 272953 ||  || — || February 1, 2006 || Mount Lemmon || Mount Lemmon Survey || HOF || align=right | 3.7 km || 
|-id=954 bgcolor=#E9E9E9
| 272954 ||  || — || February 1, 2006 || Mount Lemmon || Mount Lemmon Survey || — || align=right | 3.9 km || 
|-id=955 bgcolor=#E9E9E9
| 272955 ||  || — || February 1, 2006 || Kitt Peak || Spacewatch || — || align=right | 1.6 km || 
|-id=956 bgcolor=#E9E9E9
| 272956 ||  || — || February 1, 2006 || Kitt Peak || Spacewatch || — || align=right | 2.5 km || 
|-id=957 bgcolor=#E9E9E9
| 272957 ||  || — || February 1, 2006 || Kitt Peak || Spacewatch || GEF || align=right | 4.2 km || 
|-id=958 bgcolor=#d6d6d6
| 272958 ||  || — || February 1, 2006 || Mount Lemmon || Mount Lemmon Survey || EOS || align=right | 2.3 km || 
|-id=959 bgcolor=#E9E9E9
| 272959 ||  || — || February 2, 2006 || Kitt Peak || Spacewatch || — || align=right | 1.6 km || 
|-id=960 bgcolor=#E9E9E9
| 272960 ||  || — || February 2, 2006 || Kitt Peak || Spacewatch || — || align=right | 2.1 km || 
|-id=961 bgcolor=#E9E9E9
| 272961 ||  || — || February 2, 2006 || Kitt Peak || Spacewatch || DOR || align=right | 2.6 km || 
|-id=962 bgcolor=#E9E9E9
| 272962 ||  || — || February 2, 2006 || Kitt Peak || Spacewatch || — || align=right | 3.0 km || 
|-id=963 bgcolor=#E9E9E9
| 272963 ||  || — || February 3, 2006 || Kitt Peak || Spacewatch || WIT || align=right | 1.1 km || 
|-id=964 bgcolor=#E9E9E9
| 272964 ||  || — || February 4, 2006 || Mount Lemmon || Mount Lemmon Survey || GEF || align=right | 1.8 km || 
|-id=965 bgcolor=#E9E9E9
| 272965 ||  || — || February 5, 2006 || Kitt Peak || Spacewatch || HEN || align=right | 1.0 km || 
|-id=966 bgcolor=#d6d6d6
| 272966 ||  || — || February 6, 2006 || Mount Lemmon || Mount Lemmon Survey || — || align=right | 2.7 km || 
|-id=967 bgcolor=#E9E9E9
| 272967 ||  || — || February 4, 2006 || Catalina || CSS || — || align=right | 3.2 km || 
|-id=968 bgcolor=#d6d6d6
| 272968 ||  || — || February 1, 2006 || Mount Lemmon || Mount Lemmon Survey || K-2 || align=right | 1.5 km || 
|-id=969 bgcolor=#E9E9E9
| 272969 ||  || — || February 20, 2006 || Kitt Peak || Spacewatch || HEN || align=right | 1.5 km || 
|-id=970 bgcolor=#E9E9E9
| 272970 ||  || — || February 20, 2006 || Catalina || CSS || AGN || align=right | 1.8 km || 
|-id=971 bgcolor=#d6d6d6
| 272971 ||  || — || February 20, 2006 || Kitt Peak || Spacewatch || KAR || align=right | 1.3 km || 
|-id=972 bgcolor=#d6d6d6
| 272972 ||  || — || February 20, 2006 || Catalina || CSS || — || align=right | 4.0 km || 
|-id=973 bgcolor=#E9E9E9
| 272973 ||  || — || February 20, 2006 || Mount Lemmon || Mount Lemmon Survey || — || align=right | 2.0 km || 
|-id=974 bgcolor=#E9E9E9
| 272974 ||  || — || February 21, 2006 || Catalina || CSS || — || align=right | 3.2 km || 
|-id=975 bgcolor=#d6d6d6
| 272975 ||  || — || February 21, 2006 || Catalina || CSS || — || align=right | 4.0 km || 
|-id=976 bgcolor=#E9E9E9
| 272976 ||  || — || February 20, 2006 || Mount Lemmon || Mount Lemmon Survey || NEM || align=right | 2.9 km || 
|-id=977 bgcolor=#d6d6d6
| 272977 ||  || — || February 20, 2006 || Kitt Peak || Spacewatch || — || align=right | 2.3 km || 
|-id=978 bgcolor=#E9E9E9
| 272978 ||  || — || February 20, 2006 || Mount Lemmon || Mount Lemmon Survey || — || align=right | 2.9 km || 
|-id=979 bgcolor=#E9E9E9
| 272979 ||  || — || February 20, 2006 || Kitt Peak || Spacewatch || — || align=right | 2.8 km || 
|-id=980 bgcolor=#d6d6d6
| 272980 ||  || — || February 20, 2006 || Kitt Peak || Spacewatch || — || align=right | 2.9 km || 
|-id=981 bgcolor=#E9E9E9
| 272981 ||  || — || February 20, 2006 || Kitt Peak || Spacewatch || HOF || align=right | 3.3 km || 
|-id=982 bgcolor=#d6d6d6
| 272982 ||  || — || February 20, 2006 || Kitt Peak || Spacewatch || — || align=right | 2.8 km || 
|-id=983 bgcolor=#E9E9E9
| 272983 ||  || — || February 20, 2006 || Kitt Peak || Spacewatch || AST || align=right | 2.0 km || 
|-id=984 bgcolor=#d6d6d6
| 272984 ||  || — || February 20, 2006 || Mount Lemmon || Mount Lemmon Survey || — || align=right | 4.8 km || 
|-id=985 bgcolor=#d6d6d6
| 272985 ||  || — || February 20, 2006 || Kitt Peak || Spacewatch || — || align=right | 3.1 km || 
|-id=986 bgcolor=#E9E9E9
| 272986 ||  || — || February 20, 2006 || Kitt Peak || Spacewatch || — || align=right | 3.0 km || 
|-id=987 bgcolor=#E9E9E9
| 272987 ||  || — || February 20, 2006 || Kitt Peak || Spacewatch || — || align=right | 2.9 km || 
|-id=988 bgcolor=#d6d6d6
| 272988 ||  || — || February 20, 2006 || Kitt Peak || Spacewatch || EOS || align=right | 2.0 km || 
|-id=989 bgcolor=#d6d6d6
| 272989 ||  || — || February 20, 2006 || Mount Lemmon || Mount Lemmon Survey || KOR || align=right | 1.7 km || 
|-id=990 bgcolor=#E9E9E9
| 272990 ||  || — || February 21, 2006 || Mount Lemmon || Mount Lemmon Survey || — || align=right | 2.6 km || 
|-id=991 bgcolor=#E9E9E9
| 272991 ||  || — || February 23, 2006 || Anderson Mesa || LONEOS || — || align=right | 3.7 km || 
|-id=992 bgcolor=#d6d6d6
| 272992 ||  || — || February 20, 2006 || Catalina || CSS || — || align=right | 3.1 km || 
|-id=993 bgcolor=#E9E9E9
| 272993 ||  || — || February 20, 2006 || Kitt Peak || Spacewatch || — || align=right | 2.2 km || 
|-id=994 bgcolor=#d6d6d6
| 272994 ||  || — || February 20, 2006 || Kitt Peak || Spacewatch || KAR || align=right | 1.5 km || 
|-id=995 bgcolor=#d6d6d6
| 272995 ||  || — || February 21, 2006 || Mount Lemmon || Mount Lemmon Survey || — || align=right | 2.9 km || 
|-id=996 bgcolor=#E9E9E9
| 272996 ||  || — || February 21, 2006 || Catalina || CSS || GEF || align=right | 1.7 km || 
|-id=997 bgcolor=#E9E9E9
| 272997 ||  || — || February 24, 2006 || Mount Lemmon || Mount Lemmon Survey || HEN || align=right | 1.3 km || 
|-id=998 bgcolor=#E9E9E9
| 272998 ||  || — || February 24, 2006 || Mount Lemmon || Mount Lemmon Survey || WIT || align=right data-sort-value="0.94" | 940 m || 
|-id=999 bgcolor=#d6d6d6
| 272999 ||  || — || February 24, 2006 || Kitt Peak || Spacewatch || — || align=right | 2.8 km || 
|-id=000 bgcolor=#d6d6d6
| 273000 ||  || — || February 20, 2006 || Catalina || CSS || KOR || align=right | 1.9 km || 
|}

References

External links 
 Discovery Circumstances: Numbered Minor Planets (270001)–(275000) (IAU Minor Planet Center)

0272